= Mineralogy =

Scientific study of minerals and mineralised artifacts

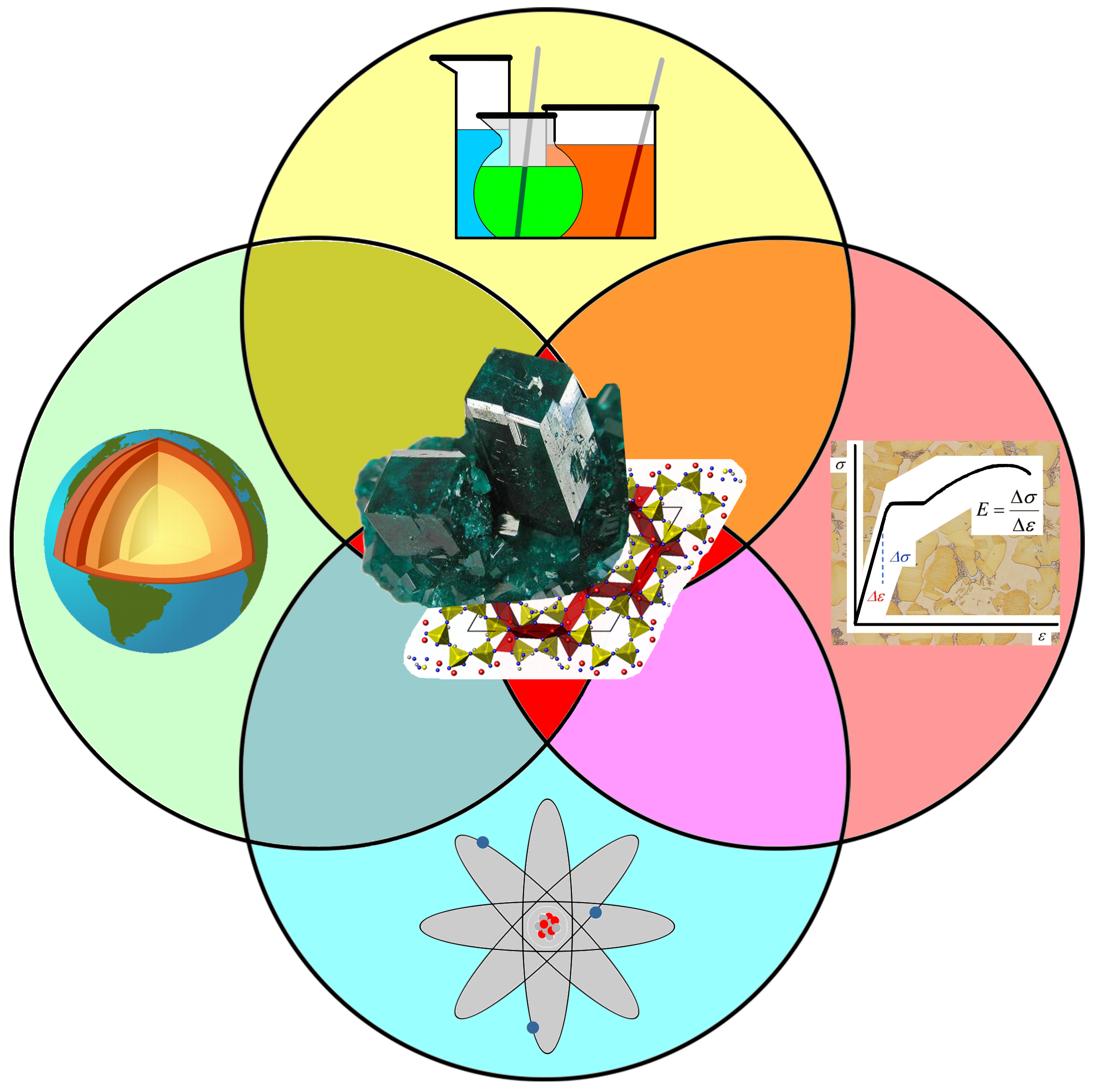
Mineralogy applies principles of chemistry, geology, physics and materials science to the study of minerals

Mineralogy is a subject of geology specializing in the scientific study of the chemistry, crystal structure, and physical (including optical) properties of minerals and mineralized artifacts. Specific studies within mineralogy include the processes of mineral origin and formation, classification of minerals, their geographical distribution, and their utilization.

== History ==
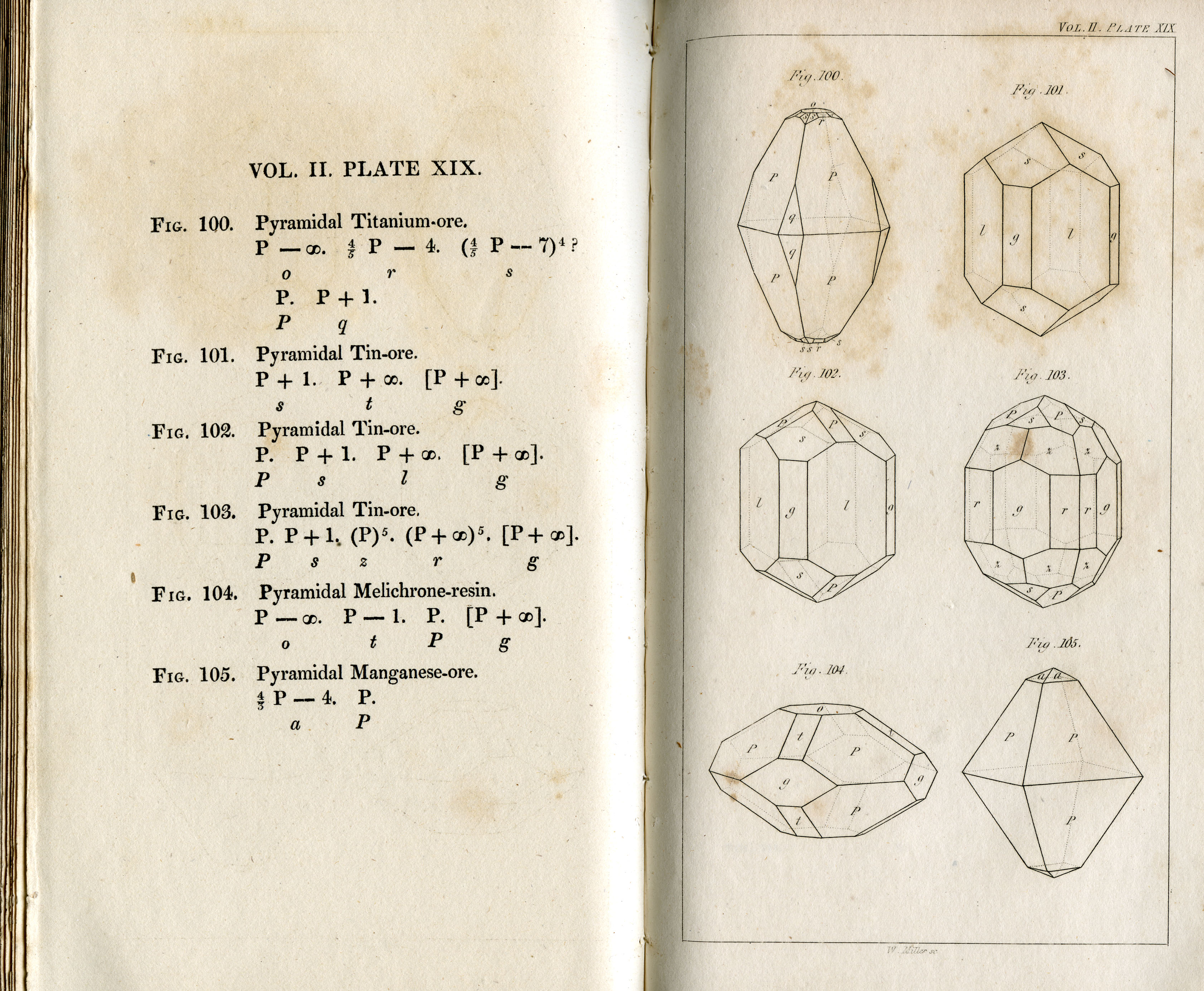
Page from Treatise on mineralogy by Friedrich Mohs (1825)

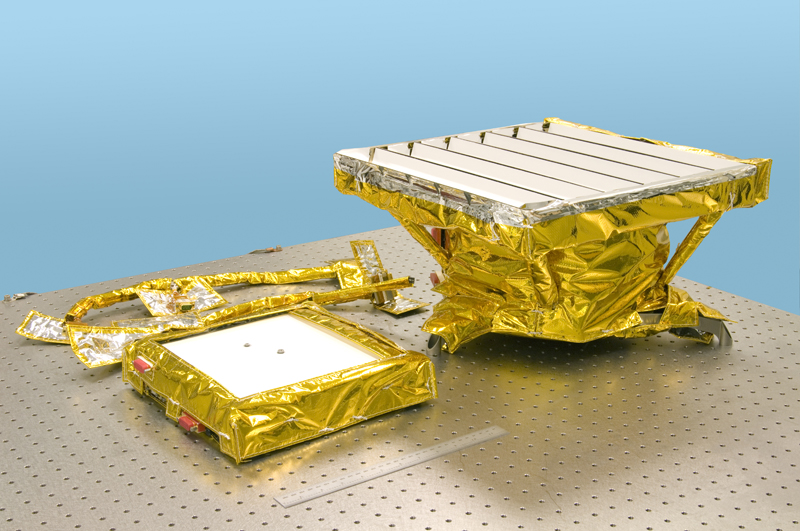
The Moon Mineralogy Mapper, a spectrometer that mapped the lunar surface

Early writing on mineralogy, especially on gemstones, comes from ancient Babylonia, the ancient Greco-Roman world, ancient and medieval China, and Sanskrit texts from ancient India and the ancient Islamic world. Books on the subject included the Natural History of Pliny the Elder, which not only described many different minerals but also explained many of their properties, and Kitab al Jawahir (Book of Precious Stones) by Persian scientist Al-Biruni. The German Renaissance specialist Georgius Agricola wrote works such as De Natura Fossilium (On the Nature of Rocks, 1546) and De re metallica (On Metals, 1556). Systematic scientific studies of minerals and rocks developed in post-Renaissance Europe. The modern study of mineralogy was founded on the principles of crystallography (the origins of geometric crystallography, itself, can be traced back to the mineralogy practiced in the eighteenth and nineteenth centuries) and to the microscopic study of rock sections with the invention of the microscope in the 17th century.

Nicholas Steno first observed the law of constancy of interfacial angles (also known as the first law of crystallography) in quartz crystals in 1669. This was later generalized and established experimentally by Jean-Baptiste L. Romé de l'Islee in 1783. René Just Haüy, the "father of modern crystallography", showed that crystals are periodic and established that the orientations of crystal faces can be expressed in terms of rational numbers (law of rational indices), as later encoded in the Miller indices. In 1814, Jöns Jacob Berzelius introduced a classification of minerals based on their chemistry rather than their crystal structure. William Nicol developed the Nicol prism, which polarizes light, in 1827–1828 while studying fossilized wood; Henry Clifton Sorby showed that thin sections of minerals could be identified by their optical properties using a polarizing microscope. James D. Dana published his first edition of A System of Mineralogy in 1837, and in a later edition introduced a chemical classification that is still the standard. X-ray diffraction was demonstrated by Max von Laue in 1912, and developed into a tool for analyzing the crystal structure of minerals by the father/son team of William Henry Bragg and William Lawrence Bragg.

More recently, driven by advances in experimental technique (such as neutron diffraction) and available computational power, the latter of which has enabled extremely accurate atomic-scale simulations of the behaviour of crystals, the science has branched out to consider more general problems in the fields of inorganic chemistry and solid-state physics. It, however, retains a focus on the crystal structures commonly encountered in rock-forming minerals (such as the perovskites, clay minerals, and framework silicates). In particular, the field has made great advances in the understanding of the relationship between the atomic-scale structure of minerals and their function; in nature, prominent examples would be accurate measurement and prediction of the elastic properties of minerals, which has led to new insight into seismological behaviour of rocks and depth-related discontinuities in seismograms of the Earth's mantle. To this end, in their focus on the connection between atomic-scale phenomena and macroscopic properties, the mineral sciences (as they are now commonly known) display perhaps more of an overlap with materials science than any other discipline.

== Physical properties ==
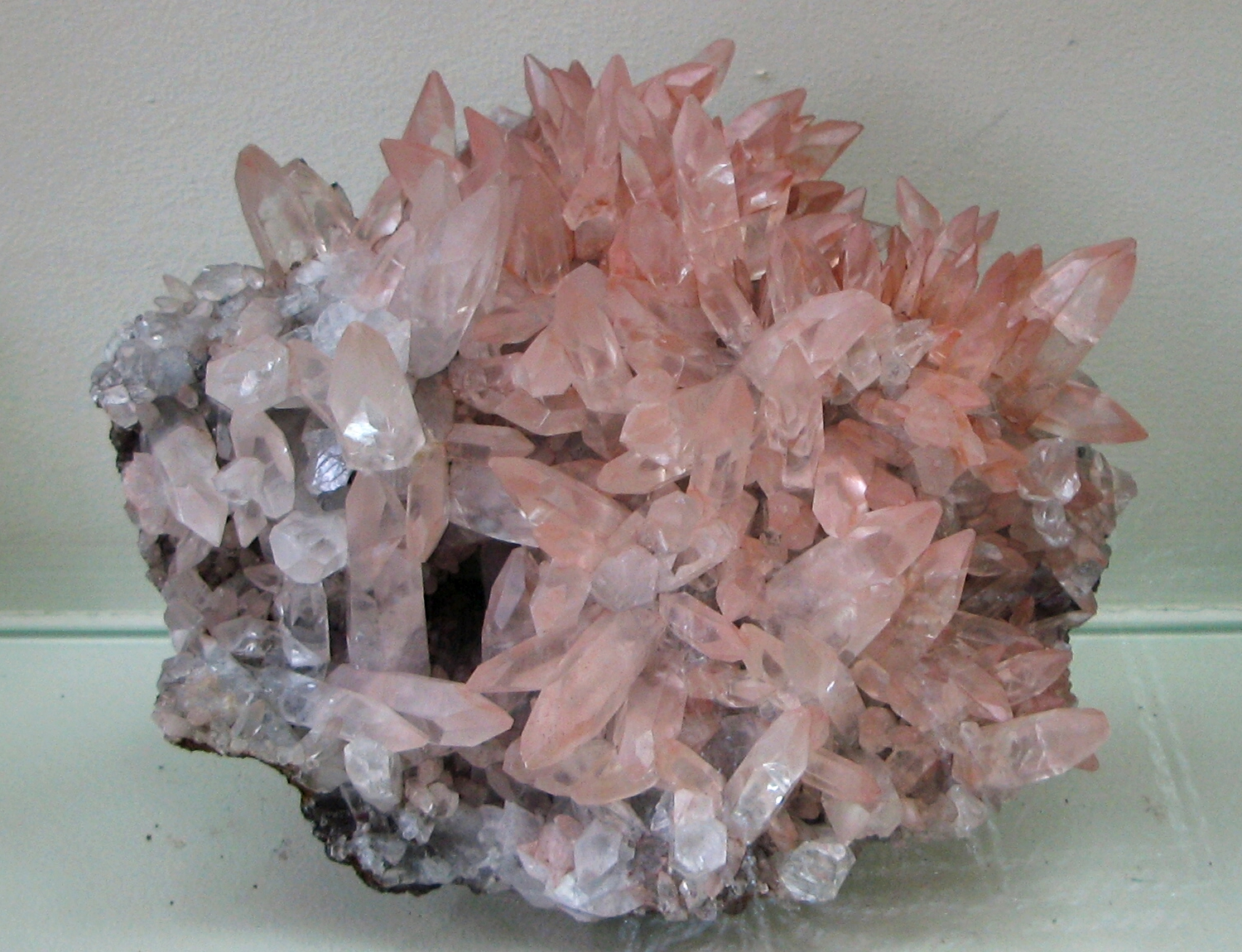
Calcite is a carbonate mineral (CaCO_{3}) with a rhombohedral crystal structure.

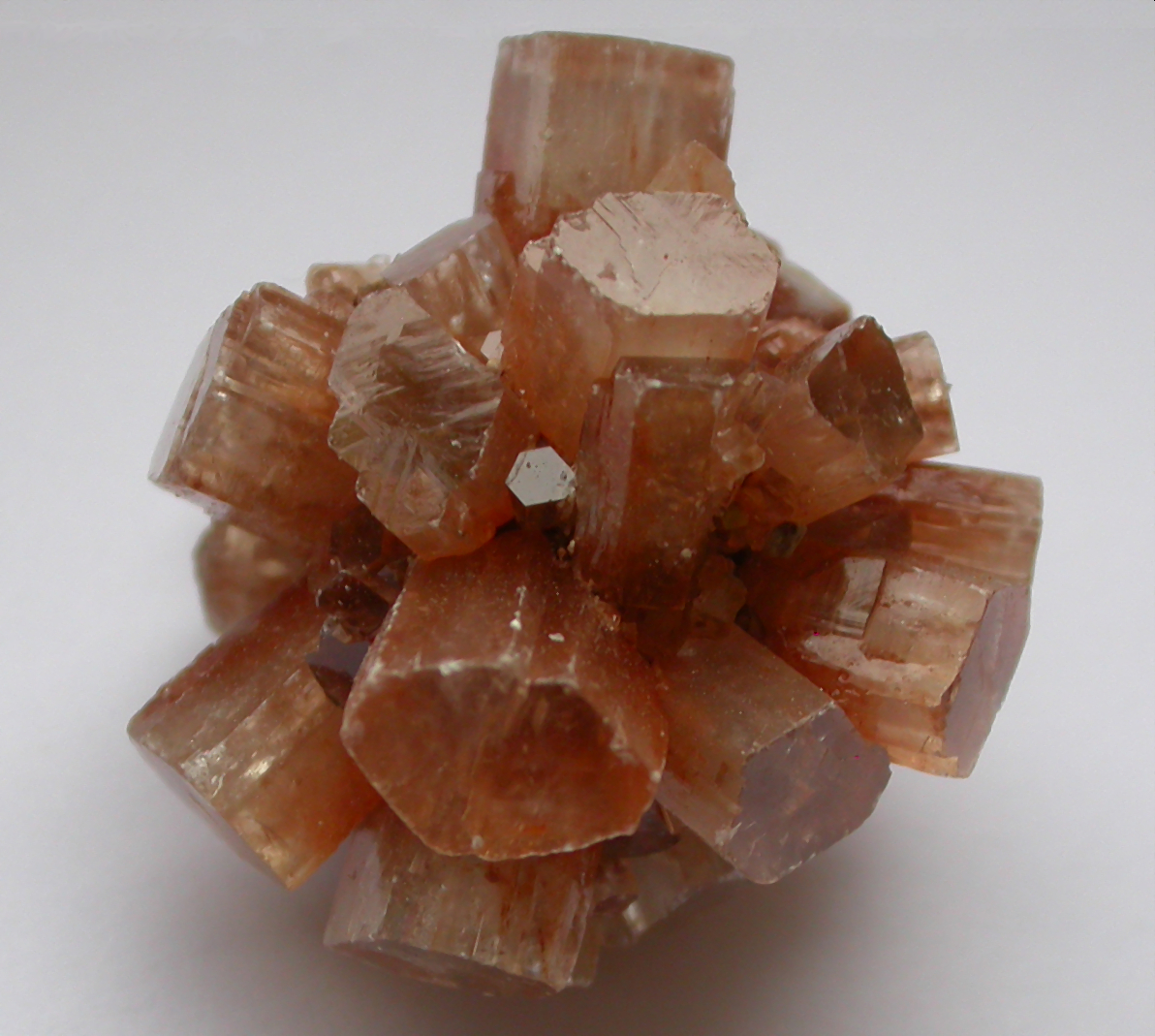
Aragonite is an orthorhombic polymorph of calcite.

An initial step in identifying a mineral is to examine its physical properties, many of which can be measured on a hand sample. These can be classified into density (often given as specific gravity); measures of mechanical cohesion (hardness, tenacity, cleavage, fracture, parting); macroscopic visual properties (luster, color, streak, luminescence, diaphaneity); magnetic and electric properties; radioactivity and solubility in hydrogen chloride (HCl).

Hardness is determined by comparison with other minerals. In the Mohs scale, a standard set of minerals is numbered in order of increasing hardness from 1 (talc) to 10 (diamond). A harder mineral will scratch a softer one, so an unknown mineral can be placed in this scale, by which minerals; it scratches and which scratch it. A few minerals, such as calcite and kyanite have a hardness that depends significantly on direction. Hardness can also be measured on an absolute scale using a sclerometer; compared to the absolute scale, the Mohs scale is nonlinear.

Tenacity refers to the way a mineral behaves when it is broken, crushed, bent or torn. A mineral can be brittle, malleable, sectile, ductile, flexible or elastic. An important influence on tenacity is the type of chemical bond (e.g., ionic or metallic).

Of the other measures of mechanical cohesion, cleavage is the tendency to break along certain crystallographic planes. It is described by the quality (e.g., perfect or fair) and the orientation of the plane in crystallographic nomenclature.

Parting is the tendency to break along planes of weakness due to pressure, twinning or exsolution. Where these two kinds of break do not occur, fracture is a less orderly form that may be conchoidal (having smooth curves resembling the interior of a shell), fibrous, splintery, hackly (jagged with sharp edges), or uneven.

If the mineral is well crystallized, it will also have a distinctive crystal habit (for example, hexagonal, columnar, botryoidal) that reflects the crystal structure or internal arrangement of atoms. It is also affected by crystal defects and twinning. Many crystals are polymorphic, having more than one possible crystal structure depending on factors such as pressure and temperature.

== Crystal structure ==
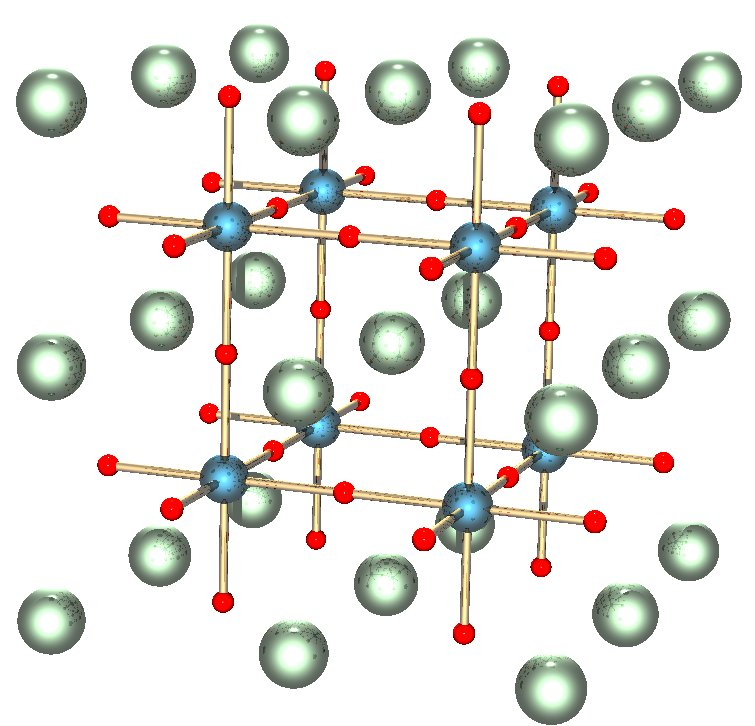
The perovskite crystal structure. The most abundant mineral in the Earth, bridgmanite, has this structure. Its chemical formula is (Mg,Fe)SiO_{3}; the red spheres are oxygen, the blue spheres silicon and the green spheres magnesium or iron.

The crystal structure is the arrangement of atoms in a crystal. It is represented by a lattice of points which repeats a basic pattern, called a unit cell, in three dimensions. The lattice can be characterized by its symmetries and by the dimensions of the unit cell. These dimensions are represented by three Miller indices. The lattice remains unchanged by certain symmetry operations about any given point in the lattice: reflection, rotation, inversion, and rotary inversion, a combination of rotation and reflection. Together, they make up a mathematical object called a crystallographic point group or crystal class. There are 32 possible crystal classes. In addition, there are operations that displace all the points: translation, screw axis, and glide plane. In combination with the point symmetries, they form 230 possible space groups.

Most geology departments have X-ray powder diffraction equipment to analyze the crystal structures of minerals. X-rays have wavelengths that are the same order of magnitude as the distances between atoms. Diffraction, the constructive and destructive interference between waves scattered at different atoms, leads to distinctive patterns of high and low intensity that depend on the geometry of the crystal. In a sample that is ground to a powder, the X-rays sample a random distribution of all crystal orientations. Powder diffraction can distinguish between minerals that may appear the same in a hand sample, for example quartz and its polymorphs tridymite and cristobalite.

Isomorphous minerals of different compositions have similar powder diffraction patterns, the main difference being in spacing and intensity of lines. For example, the NaCl (halite) crystal structure is space group Fm3m; this structure is shared by sylvite (KCl), periclase (MgO), bunsenite (NiO), galena (PbS), alabandite (MnS), chlorargyrite (AgCl), and osbornite (TiN).

== Chemical elements ==
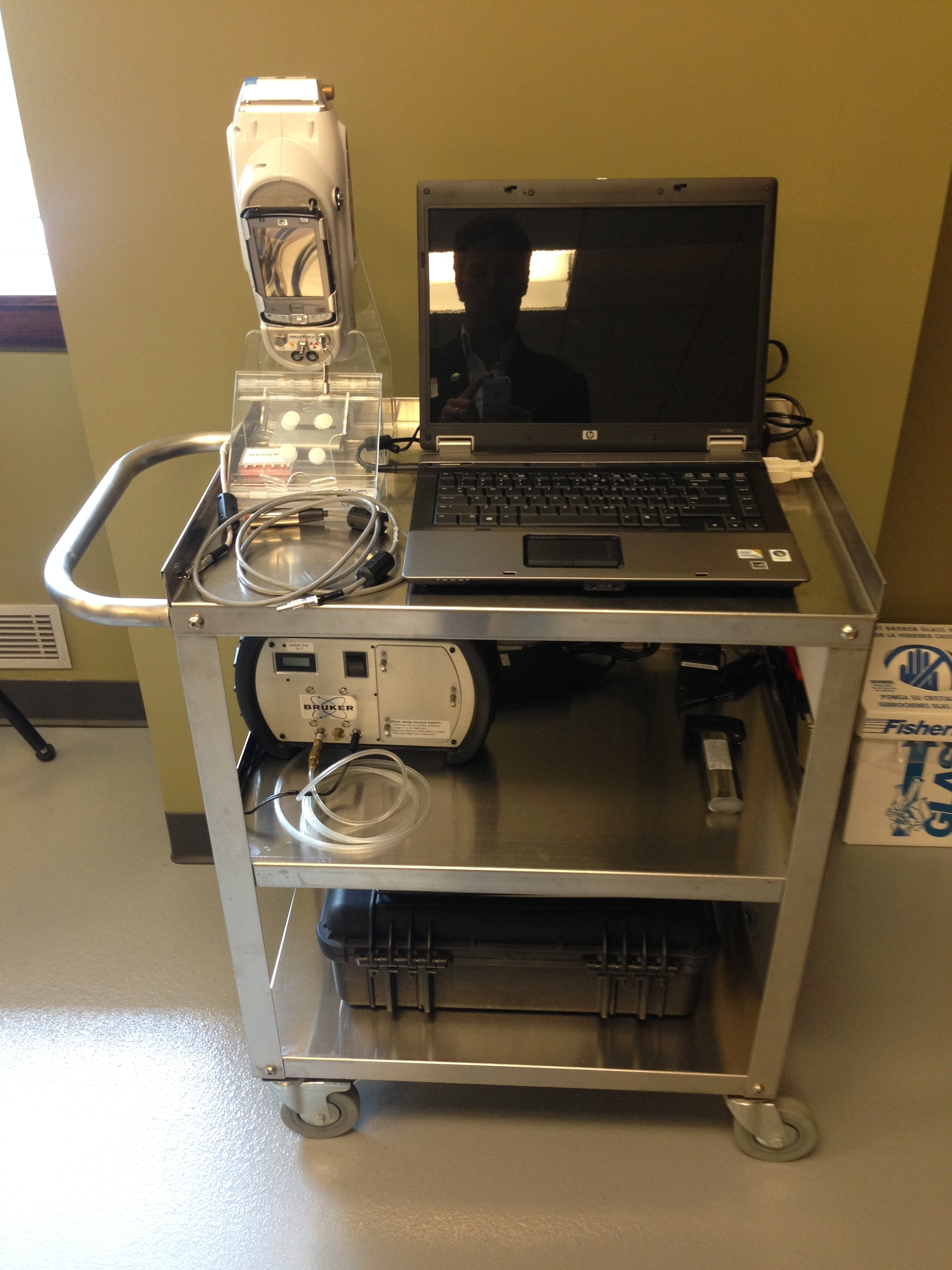
Portable Micro-X-ray fluorescence machine

A few minerals are chemical elements, including sulfur, copper, silver, and gold, but the vast majority are compounds. The classical method for identifying composition is wet chemical analysis, which involves dissolving a mineral in an acid such as hydrochloric acid (HCl). The elements in solution are then identified using colorimetry, volumetric analysis or gravimetric analysis.

Since 1960, most chemistry analysis is done using instruments. One of these, atomic absorption spectroscopy, is similar to wet chemistry in that the sample must still be dissolved, but it is much faster and cheaper. The solution is vaporized and its absorption spectrum is measured in the visible and ultraviolet range. Other techniques are X-ray fluorescence, electron microprobe analysis atom probe tomography and optical emission spectrography.

== Optical ==
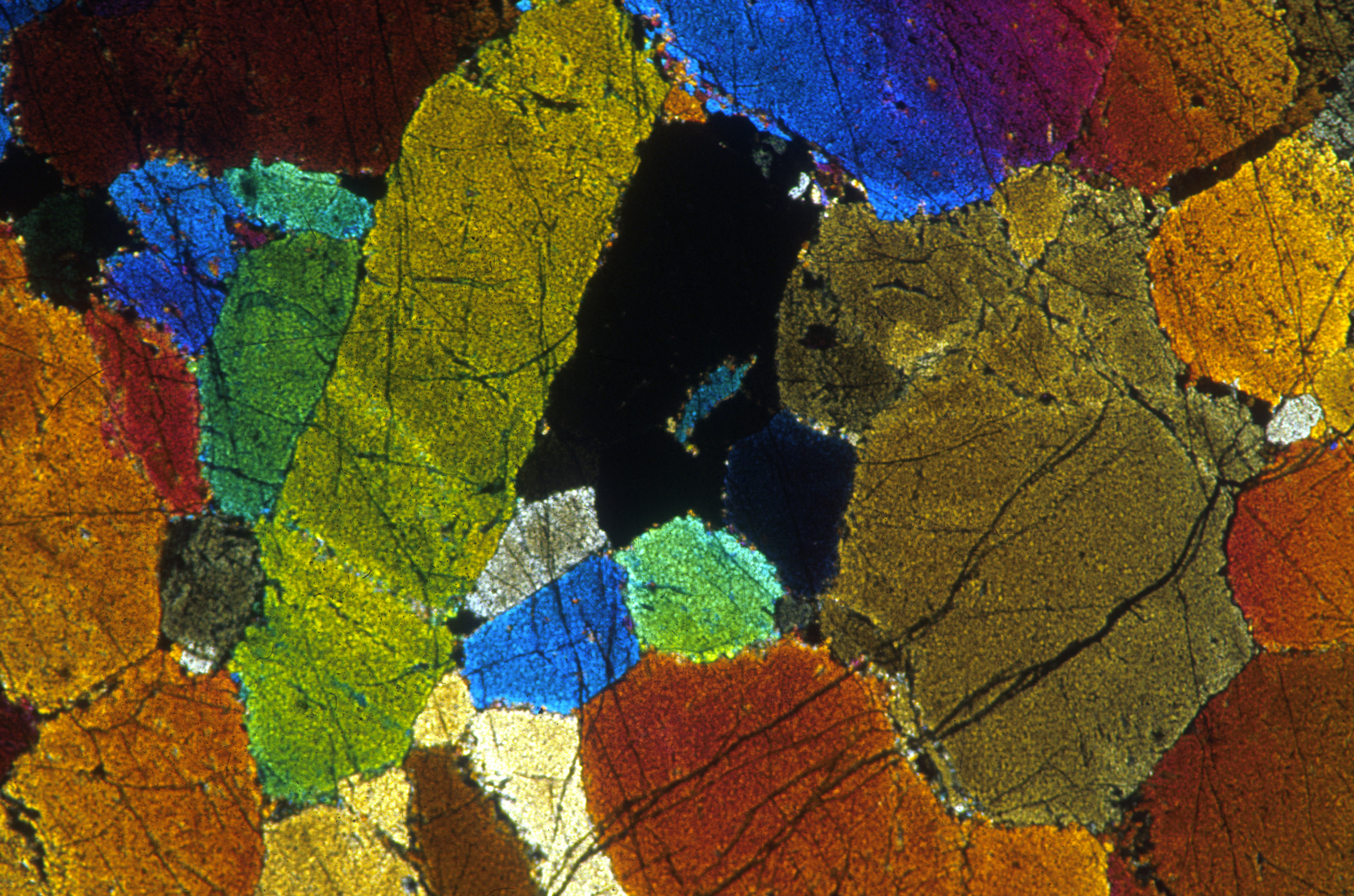
Photomicrograph of olivine adcumulate from the Archaean komatiite of Agnew, Western Australia.

In addition to macroscopic properties such as colour or lustre, minerals have properties that require a polarizing microscope to observe. Recently, the field of digital mineral study and identification has been developing based on the optical properties of minerals, including through the use of artificial intelligence technologies.

=== Transmitted light ===
When light passes from air or a vacuum into a transparent crystal, some of it is reflected at the surface and some refracted. The latter is a bending of the light path that occurs because the speed of light changes as it goes into the crystal; Snell's law relates the bending angle to the Refractive index, the ratio of speed in a vacuum to speed in the crystal. Crystals whose point symmetry group falls in the cubic system are isotropic: the index does not depend on direction. All other crystals are anisotropic: light passing through them is broken up into two plane polarized rays that travel at different speeds and refract at different angles.

A polarizing microscope is similar to an ordinary microscope, but it has two plane-polarized filters, a (polarizer) below the sample and an analyzer above it, polarized perpendicular to each other. Light passes successively through the polarizer, the sample and the analyzer. If there is no sample, the analyzer blocks all the light from the polarizer. However, an anisotropic sample will generally change the polarization so some of the light can pass through. Thin sections and powders can be used as samples.

When an isotropic crystal is viewed, it appears dark because it does not change the polarization of the light. However, when it is immersed in a calibrated liquid with a lower index of refraction and the microscope is thrown out of focus, a bright line called a Becke line appears around the perimeter of the crystal. By observing the presence or absence of such lines in liquids with different indices, the index of the crystal can be estimated, usually to within ± 0.003.

== Systematic ==
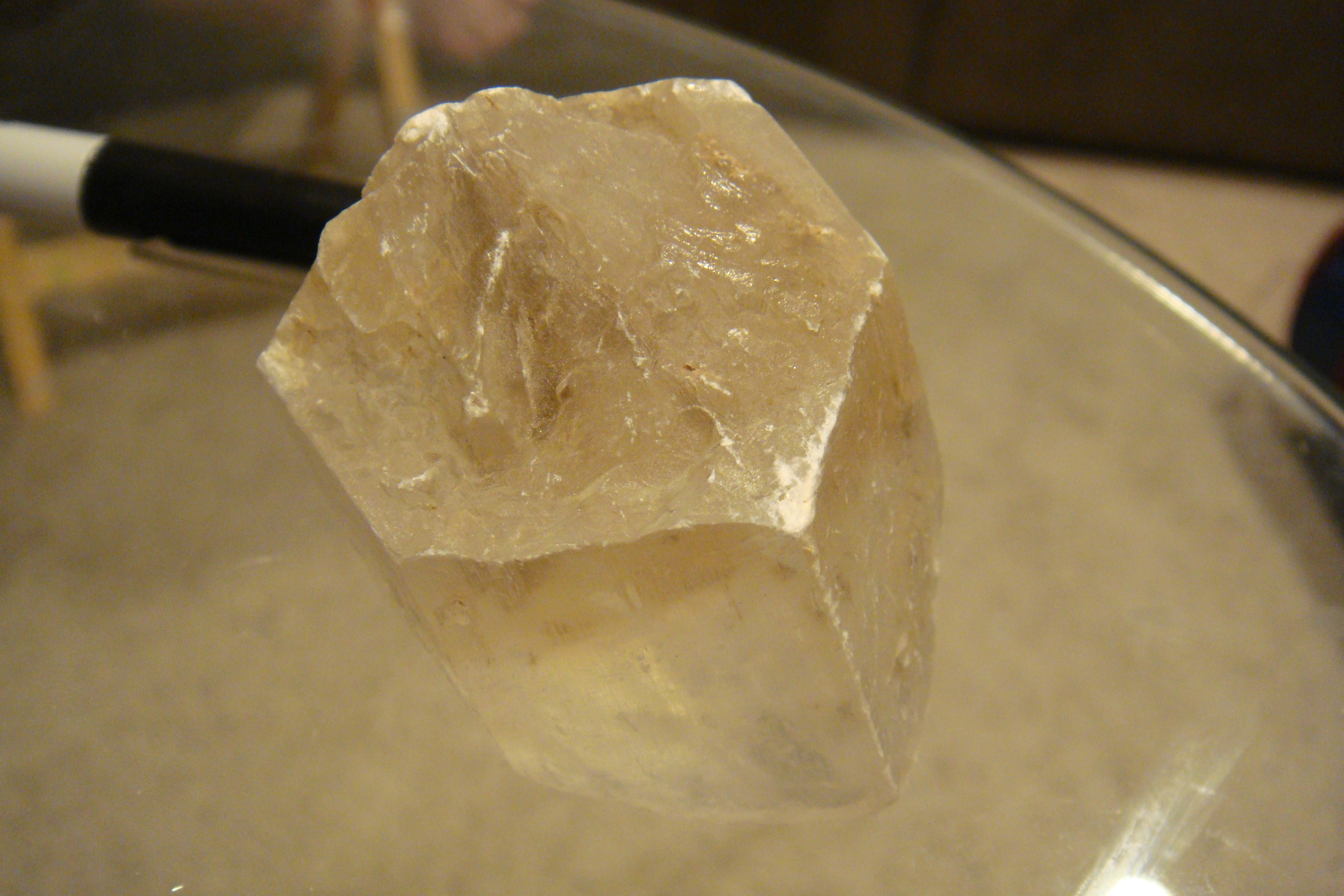
Hanksite, Na_{22}K(SO_{4})_{9}(CO_{3})_{2}Cl, one of the few minerals that is considered a carbonate and a sulfate

Systematic mineralogy is the identification and classification of minerals by their properties. Historically, mineralogy was heavily concerned with taxonomy of the rock-forming minerals. In 1959, the International Mineralogical Association formed the Commission of New Minerals and Mineral Names to rationalize the nomenclature and regulate the introduction of new names. In July 2006, it was merged with the Commission on Classification of Minerals to form the Commission on New Minerals, Nomenclature, and Classification. There are over 6,000 named and unnamed minerals, and about 100 are discovered each year. The Manual of Mineralogy places minerals in the following classes: native elements, sulfides, sulfosalts, oxides and hydroxides, halides, carbonates, nitrates and borates, sulfates, chromates, molybdates and tungstates, phosphates, arsenates and vanadates, and silicates.

== Formation environments ==
The environments of mineral formation and growth are highly varied, ranging from slow crystallization at the high temperatures and pressures of igneous melts deep within the Earth's crust to the low temperature precipitation from a saline brine at the Earth's surface.

Various possible methods of formation include:

- sublimation from volcanic gases
- deposition from aqueous solutions and hydrothermal brines
- crystallization from an igneous magma or lava
- recrystallization due to metamorphic processes and metasomatism
- crystallization during diagenesis of sediments
- formation by oxidation and weathering of rocks exposed to the atmosphere or within the soil environment.

== Biomineralogy ==
Biomineralogy is a cross-over field between mineralogy, paleontology and biology. It is the study of how plants and animals stabilize minerals under biological control, and the sequencing of mineral replacement of those minerals after deposition. It uses techniques from chemical mineralogy, especially isotopic studies, to determine such things as growth forms in living plants and animals as well as things like the original mineral content of fossils.

A new approach to mineralogy called mineral evolution explores the co-evolution of the geosphere and biosphere, including the role of minerals in the origin of life and processes as mineral-catalyzed organic synthesis and the selective adsorption of organic molecules on mineral surfaces.

== Mineral ecology ==
In 2011, several researchers began to develop a Mineral Evolution Database. This database integrates the crowd-sourced site Mindat.org, which has over 690,000 mineral-locality pairs, with the official IMA list of approved minerals and age data from geological publications.

This database makes it possible to apply statistics to answer new questions, an approach that has been called mineral ecology. One such question is how much of mineral evolution is deterministic and how much the result of chance. Some factors are deterministic, such as the chemical nature of a mineral and conditions for its stability; but mineralogy can also be affected by the processes that determine a planet's composition. In a 2015 paper, Robert Hazen and others analyzed the number of minerals involving each element as a function of its abundance. They found that Earth, with over 4800 known minerals and 72 elements, has a power law relationship. The Moon, with only 63 minerals and 24 elements (based on a much smaller sample) has essentially the same relationship. This implies that, given the chemical composition of the planet, one could predict the more common minerals. However, the distribution has a long tail, with 34% of the minerals having been found at only one or two locations. The model predicts that thousands more mineral species may await discovery or have formed and then been lost to erosion, burial or other processes. This implies a role of chance in the formation of rare minerals occur.

In another use of big data sets, network theory was applied to a dataset of carbon minerals, revealing new patterns in their diversity and distribution. The analysis can show which minerals tend to coexist and what conditions (geological, physical, chemical and biological) are associated with them. This information can be used to predict where to look for new deposits and even new mineral species.

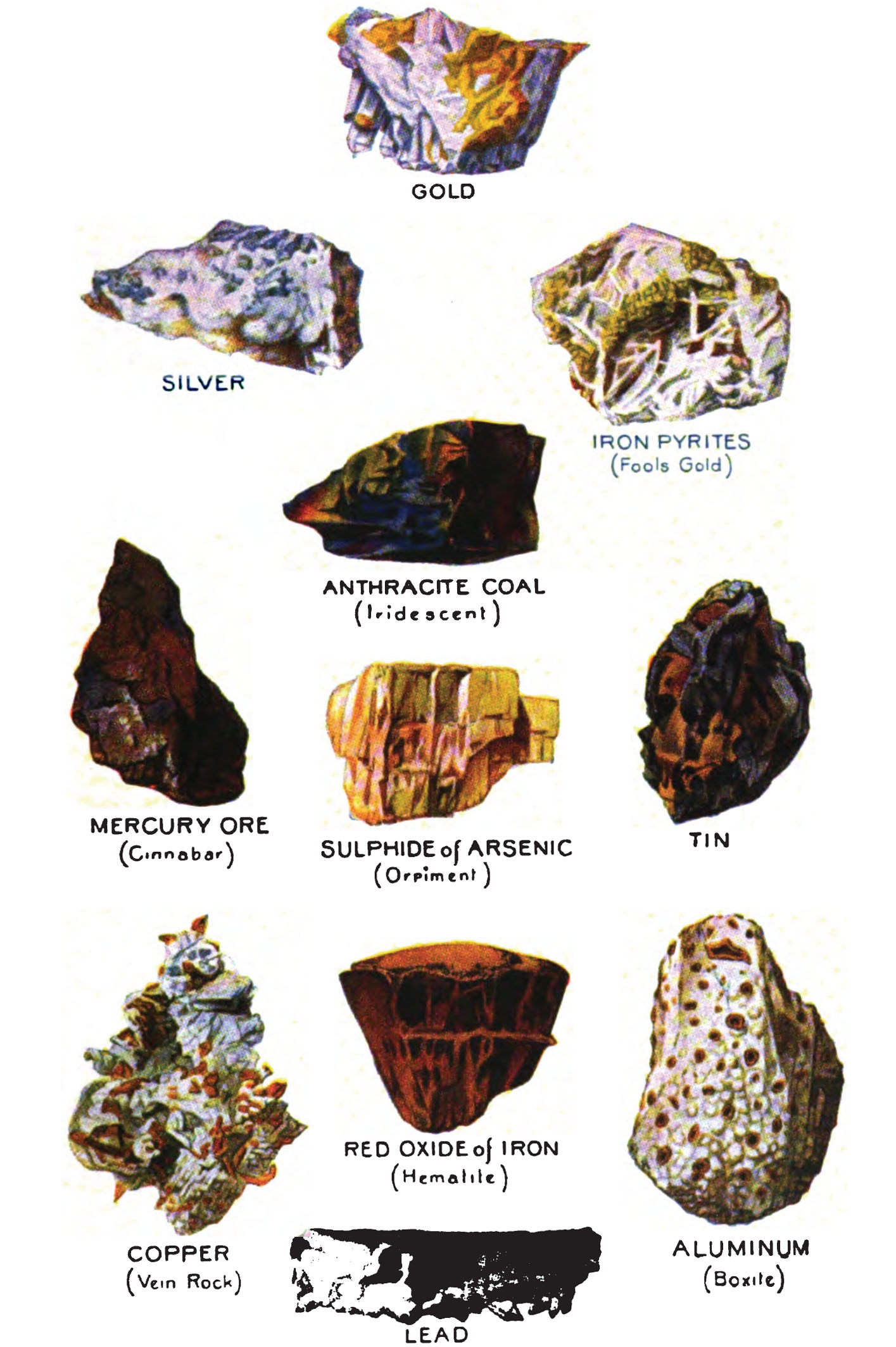
A color chart of some raw forms of commercially valuable metals.

== Uses ==
Minerals are essential to various needs within human society, such as minerals used as ores for essential components of metal products used in various commercial products and machinery, essential components to building materials such as limestone, marble, granite, gravel, glass, plaster, cement, etc. Minerals are also used in fertilizers to enrich the growth of agricultural crops.

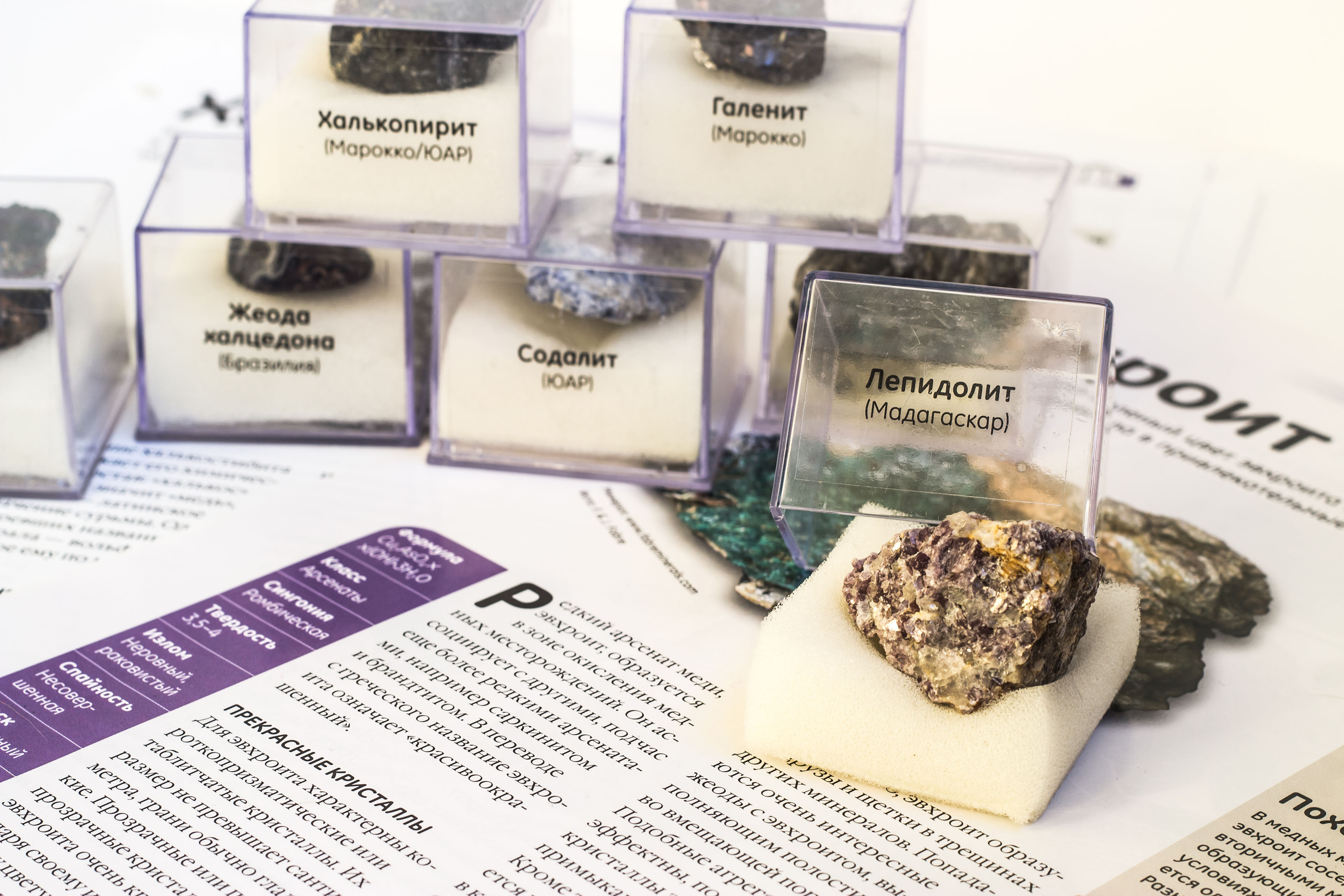
A small collection of mineral samples, with cases. Labels in Russian.

=== Collecting ===
Mineral collecting is also a recreational study and collection hobby, with clubs and societies representing the field. Museums, such as the Smithsonian National Museum of Natural History Hall of Geology, Gems, and Minerals, the Natural History Museum of Los Angeles County, the Carnegie Museum of Natural History, the Natural History Museum, London, and the private Mim Mineral Museum in Beirut, Lebanon, have popular collections of mineral specimens on permanent display.

== See also ==
- List of minerals
- List of minerals recognized by the International Mineralogical Association
- List of mineralogists
- Mineral physics
- Metallurgy
- Petrology
