= Johann F. C. Hessel =

German physician and professor (1796–1872)

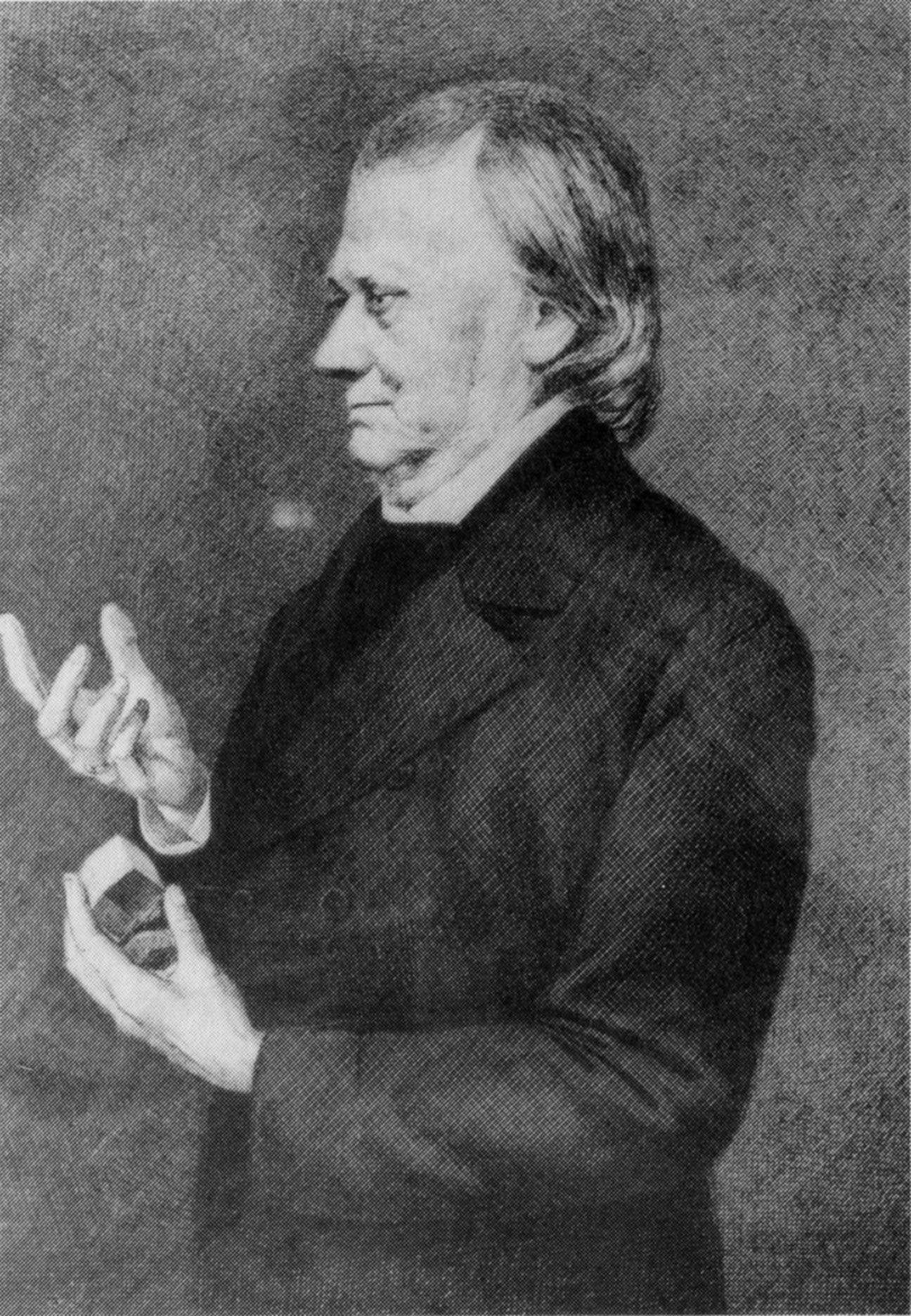
Nineteenth century drawing of Johann Friedrich Christian Hessel

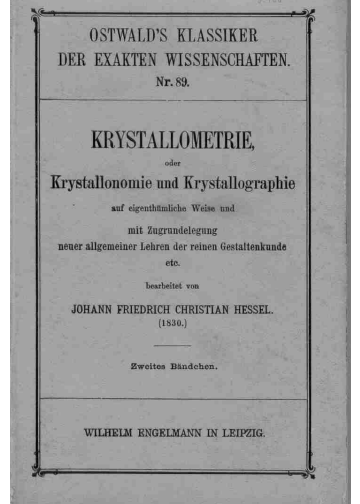
1897 book in which Hessel's work was re-published

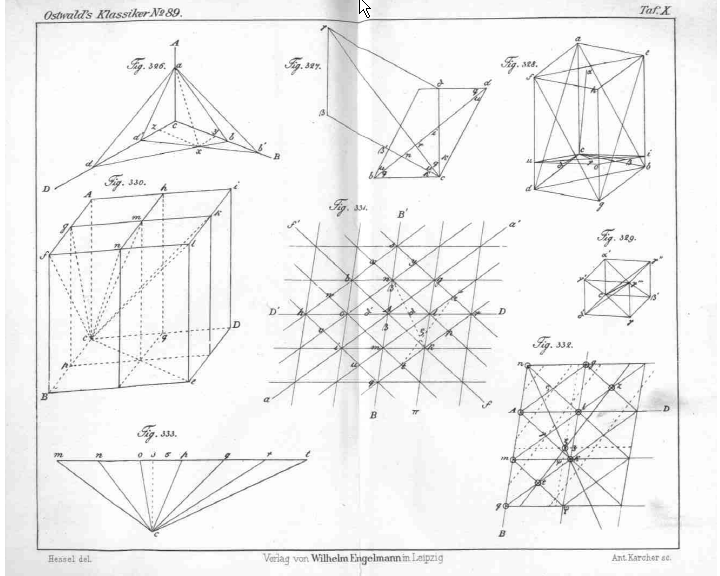
Some of Hessel's original drawings

Johann Friedrich Christian Hessel (27 April 1796 – 3 June 1872) was a German physician (MD, University of Würzburg, 1817) and professor of mineralogy (PhD, University of Heidelberg, 1821) at the University of Marburg.

== Contributions to Mineralogy and Crystallography ==
The origins of geometric crystallography (the field concerned with the structures of crystalline solids), for which Hessel's work was noteworthy, can be traced back to eighteenth and nineteenth century mineralogy. Hessel also made contributions to classical mineralogy (the field concerned with the chemical compositions and physical properties of minerals), as well.

=== Derivation of the Crystal Classes ===
In 1830, Hessel proved that, as a consequence of Haüy’s law of rational indices, morphological forms can combine to give exactly 32 kinds of crystal symmetry in Euclidean space, since only two-, three-, four-, and six-fold rotation axes can occur. A crystal form here denotes a set of symmetrically equivalent planes with Miller indices enclosed in braces, {hkl}; form does not mean "shape". For example, a cube-shaped crystal of fluorite (referred to as Flussspath by Hessel) has six equivalent faces. The entire set is denoted as {100}. The indices for each of the individual six faces are enclosed by parentheses and these are designated: (010), (001), (100), (01̅0), (001̅), and (1̅00). The cube belongs to the isometric or tessular class, as do an octahedron and tetrahedron. The essential symmetry elements of the isometric class is the existence of a set of three 4-fold, four 3-fold, and six 2-fold rotation axes. In the earlier classification schemes by the German mineralogists Christian Samuel Weiss (1780 - 1856) and Friedrich Mohs (1773 - 1839) the isometric class had been designated sphäroedrisch (spheroidal) and tessularisch (tesseral), respectively. As of Hessel's time, not all of the 32 possible symmetries had actually been observed in real crystals.

Hessel's work originally appeared in 1830 as an article in Gehler’s Physikalische Wörterbuch (Gehler's Physics Dictionary). It went unnoticed until it was republished in 1897 as part of a collection of papers on crystallography in Oswalds Klassiker der exakten Wissenschaften (Ostwald's Classics of the Exact Sciences). Prior to this posthumous re-publication of Hessel's investigations, similar findings had been reported by the French scientist Auguste Bravais (1811–1863) in Extrait J. Math., Pures et Applique ́es (in 1849) and by the Russian crystallographer Axel Gadolin in 1867.

All three derivations (Hessel's, Bravais', and Gadolin's), which established a small finite number of possible crystal symmetries from first principles, were based on external crystal morphology rather than a crystal's internal structural arrangement (i.e. lattice symmetry). However, the 32 classes of crystal symmetry are one-and-the-same as the 32 crystallographic point groups. After seminal work on space lattices by Leonhard Sohncke (1842–1897), Arthur Moritz Schönflies (1853–1928), Evgraf Stepanovich Fedorov (1853–1919), and William Barlow (1845–1934), the connection between space lattices and the external morphology of crystals was espoused by Paul Niggli (1888 - 1953), particularly in his 1928 Kristallographische und Strukturtheoretische Grundbegriffe.^{[2]} For example, the repetition, or translation (physics), of a lattice plane produces a stack of parallel planes, the last member of which may be manifested morphologically as one of the external faces of the crystal.

Briefly, a crystal is similar to three-dimensional wallpaper, in that it is an endless repetition of some motif (a group of atoms or molecules). The motif is created by point group operations, while the wallpaper, which is called the space lattice, is generated by translation of the motif with or without rotation or reflection. The symmetry of the motif is the true point group symmetry of the crystal and it causes the symmetry of the external forms. Specifically, the crystal's external morphological symmetry must conform to the angular components of the space group symmetry operations, without the translational components. Under favorable circumstances, point groups (but not space groups) can be determined solely by examination of the crystal morphology, without the need for analysis of an X-ray diffraction pattern. This is not always possible because, of the many forms normally apparent or expected in a typical crystal specimen, some forms may be absent or show unequal development. The word habit is used to describe the overall external shape of a crystal specimen, which depends on the relative sizes of the faces of the various forms present. In general, a substance may crystallize in different habits because the growth rates of the various faces need not be the same.^{[2]}

=== Exceptions to Euler's Formula for Convex Polyhedra ===
Following the work of the Swiss mathematician Simon Antoine Jean L'Huilier (1750 - 1840), Hessel also gave specific examples of compound crystals (aka double crystals) for which Euler's formula for convex polyhedra failed. In this case, the sum of the valence (degree) and the number of faces does not equal two plus the number of edges (V + F ≠ E + 2). Such exceptions can occur when a polyhedron possesses internal cavities, which, in turn, occur when one crystal encapsulates another. Hessel found this to be true with lead sulfide crystals inside calcium fluoride crystals. Hessel also found Euler's formula disobeyed with interconnected polyhedra, for example, where an edge or vertex is shared by more than two faces (e.g. as in edge-sharing and vertex-sharing tetrahedra).^{[5]}

=== Feldspar Composition ===
In the field of classical mineralogy, Hessel showed that the plagioclase feldspars could be considered solid solutions of albite and anorthite. His analysis was published in 1826 (Taschenbuch für die gesammte Mineralogie, 20 [1826], 289–333) but, as with his work on the crystal classes, it did not garner much attention among his contemporaries. Rather, the theory of the composition of these feldspars was subsequently credited to Gustav Tschermak (1836 - 1927) in 1865.^{[1]}

== Early life and education ==
Little is documented about Hessel's early life. He was a student at the Realschule in Nuremberg and subsequently studied science and medicine at Erlangen and Würzburg.^{[1]} After receiving his PhD in mineralogy under Karl C. von Leonhard (1779–1862), Hessel went to the University of Marburg as an associate professor of mineralogy and became full professor in 1825. He remained there until his death.^{[1]} Hessel was also a Marburg city council member and was named an honorary citizen of Marburg on November 9, 1840.

== See also ==
- Geometrical crystallography before X-rays
