= Law of symmetry (crystallography) =

Crystallographic law

Truncation of the vertices of a cube yielding an octahedron. Both solids have identical symmetry elements.

The law of symmetry is a law in the field of crystallography concerning crystal structure. The law states that all crystals of the same substance possess the same elements of symmetry. The law is also named the law of constancy of symmetry, Haüy's law or the third law of crystallography.

== Definition ==
The way in which the law of symmetry was originally defined by Haüy in 1815 was based on his law of decrements and his conception of crystals being assembled of tiny parallelepipeds (molécules intégrantes) stacked up in three dimensions without leaving any gaps. The modern definition of the law of symmetry is based on symmetry elements, and is more in the German dynamistic crystallographic tradition of Christian Samuel Weiss, Moritz Ludwig Frankenheim and Johann F. C. Hessel. Weiss and his followers studied the external symmetry of crystals rather than their internal structure.

René Just Haüy first lectured about his law of symmetry in 1795 but it was not until 1815 that it was finally published. Haüy states the law as follows: "It consists in this, that any one method of decrement (décroissement) is repeated on all those parts of the nucleus of which the resemblance is such, that one can be substituted for the other by changing the position of this nucleus with respect to the eye, without it (the nucleus) ceasing to be presented in the same aspect"

Later authors stated the law in clearer forms:

- "The law of symmetry by René Just Haüy (1815): if the shape of a crystal is altered, corresponding parts (faces, edges, angles) of the crystal are simultaneously and similarly modified."
- "One of the most important results of Haüy's researches was the discovery of the law of symmetry, according to which when one form of crystallization is modified by its combination with other forms, all the similar parts, the edges, angles and faces, are always modified at the same time and in the same way.
- "The way in which nature produces crystals is always that of the greatest symmetry, in that opposite and corresponding parts are always equal in number, arrangement and shape." René Haüy, 1815.
- The law of symmetry stands out as one of the foremost contributions by Haüy. It is more an intuition than a true scientific law, but warned crystallographers on the importance of symmetry. This is one of its possible formulations: "A given type of decrement repeats itself on all the parts of the nucleus that are so similar that they can be substituted one for the other, when changing the position of this nucleus with respect to the eye. I call this [sic] parts identical."

== Symmetry elements ==
Haüy's method of building crystals from stacked parallelepipeds has been replaced in modern crystallography by three-dimensional lattices (Bravais lattices). The 32 crystallographic point groups combine the following symmetry elements.

=== Axis of symmetry ===
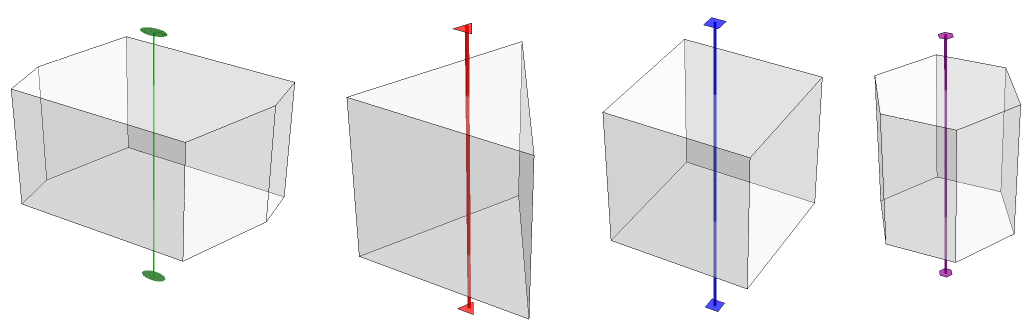
2-, 3-, 4- and 6-fold rotation axes

If a crystal has an axis of symmetry through its centre, such that the crystal can be rotated around the axis into a position where it appears identical to the starting position, then it has an axis of symmetry. A crystal may have zero, one, or multiple axes of symmetry but, by the crystallographic restriction theorem, the order of rotation may only be 2-fold, 3-fold, 4-fold, or 6-fold for each axis. An exception is made for quasicrystals which may have other orders of rotation, for example 5-fold. An axis of symmetry is also known as a proper rotation.

Cubes with different planes of symmetry

=== Plane of symmetry ===
If a crystal can be divided by a plane into two mirror-image halves, then the plane is a plane of symmetry. A crystal may have zero, one, or multiple planes of symmetry. For example, a cube has nine planes of symmetry. A plane of symmetry is also known as reflection symmetry or mirror symmetry.

=== Centre of symmetry ===
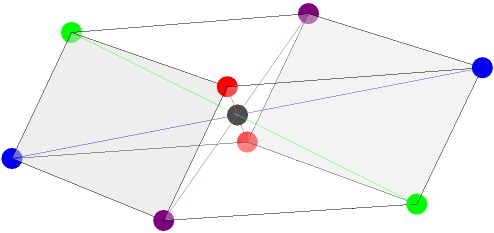
Centre of symmetry

If every face of a crystal has another identical face at an equal distance from a central point, then this point is called the centre of symmetry symbolised as i. A crystal can only have one centre of symmetry. A centre of symmetry is also known as point reflection, inversion symmetry, or centrosymmetry.

=== Rotoinversion symmetry ===
2-fold (2̅) rotoinversion

A rotoinversion, symbolised as (1̅, 2̅, 3̅, 4̅ or 6̅), is a combination of a rotation about an axis and a reflection in a plane perpendicular to that axis. As an example, a two-fold rotoinversion (2̅) is illustrated in the figure. Rotoinversion is also known as improper rotation, rotoreflection, or rotation-reflection.

== History ==
René Just Haüy showed in 1784 that the law of constancy of interfacial angles could be accounted for if a crystal were made up of minute building blocks (molécules intégrantes), such as cubes, parallelepipeds, or rhombohedra. Haüy's method is named the law of decrements. The law of rational indices was not stated in its modern form by Haüy, but it is directly implied by his law of decrements.

Cube to octahedron by truncation of all vertices (holohedry)

Cube to tetrahedron by truncation of alternate vertices (hemihedry)

Haüy spoke for the first time about a law of symmetry in his physics classes at the École Normale Supérieure in 1795. In his memoir of 1815 Haüy related the number and the position of the faces observed on the external form of crystals to the symmetry of the hypothetical nucleus. However, he deliberately excludes certain crystals, among others boracite, quartz, and the tourmalines. He was forced to exclude some substances because their crystals did not exhibit holohedry (all of the edges and faces behave in an equivalent manner), as required by his law of symmetry, but rather hemihedry (half of the edges and faces are equivalent and the other half act differently). In the figure, a cube is transformed into an octahedron when all the faces are decremented by an identical amount at each vertex (holohedry), but into a tetrahedron when only alternate faces are decremented (hemihedry), an example being boracite. Haüy knew about the pyroelectric effect and the polarity induced in tourmaline by a change of temperature; he thought that the hemihedry these crystals exhibited might be accounted for by different electric forces acting on the two extremities of the axis of the crystal during growth.

Haüy discovered that in some quartz crystals, certain faces were inclined more towards one side than the other. He called this type of quartz crystal 'plagihedral' and differentiated right from left plagihedra, depending on which direction the face was inclined. In practice, Haüy knew that there were counter-examples to his law of symmetry, such as plagihedral quartz, but as he did not have an explanation for them, he dismissed them merely as rare anomalies. In summary, hemimorphic forms, such as quartz and tourmaline, caused Haüy's law of symmetry great difficulties. In 1819, Weiss demonstrated the generality of this phenomenon and gave it the name of hemihedry, thus challenging Haüy's atomistic approach. The modern definition of hemihedry is: "The point group of a crystal is called hemihedry if it is a subgroup of index 2 of the point group of its lattice." The point group T_{d} (tetrahedral symmetry) is a subgroup of index 2 of point group O_{h} (octahedral symmetry).

In his 1815 law of symmetry papers Haüy postulated the idea of rotational symmetry in crystals but he considered only a single (vertical) axis of rotation, which made it difficult to explain the observed crystal forms with additional (horizontal) axes of rotation. As an example, Haüy did not recognize the existence of a horizontal axis of two-fold symmetry in cobaltite, and so could not include this mineral in his law of symmetry.

The German mineralogists led by Weiss were interested in the optical properties of minerals and the systematic descriptions of crystals. Their approach led to the first two determinations of all 32 point groups by Frankenheim in 1826 and Hessel, using a different approach which combined symmetry elements, in 1830. Their work was not influential at the time, and, in 1867, Axel Gadolin independently rediscovered their results.

Gabriel Delafosse continued Haüy's work in France. He was the first to use the terms lattice (réseau) and unit cell (maille). He stated that the orientation of the molecular axes in a substance is constant, which implies symmetry of translation (a defining feature of a lattice), and that the external symmetry of a crystal reflects its inner symmetry, namely the symmetry of the constituent atoms and their arrangement. In other words, the law of symmetry applies to both the inside and the outside of a crystal.

French scientists did not adopt the dynamic crystallographic theory, but they did attempted to learn from it. Delafosse built on Haüy's crystallographic approach by stating that the structure and physical properties of crystals should exhibit the same symmetry. Delafosse aimed to resolve the apparent counter-examples to Haüy's law of symmetry by explaining that the symmetry of the physical phenomena revealed the inner structure of crystals. This structure is sometimes more complex than the external morphology. Crystals, in these cases, are of lower symmetry than the lattice. This substructure explained the behaviour of hemihedral crystals, which were not adequately accounted for by Haüy.

Later work by Auguste Bravais in 1851 in which he defined the Bravais lattices can be considered as drawing on a combination of the approaches of Haüy and Weiss.

== See also ==
- Geometrical crystallography before X-rays
- Law of constancy of interfacial angles
- Law of rational indices
