= Niels Steensen =

Danish scientist and Catholic bishop (1638 – 1686)

Blessed Niels Steensen
- Vicar Apostolic of Nordic Missions
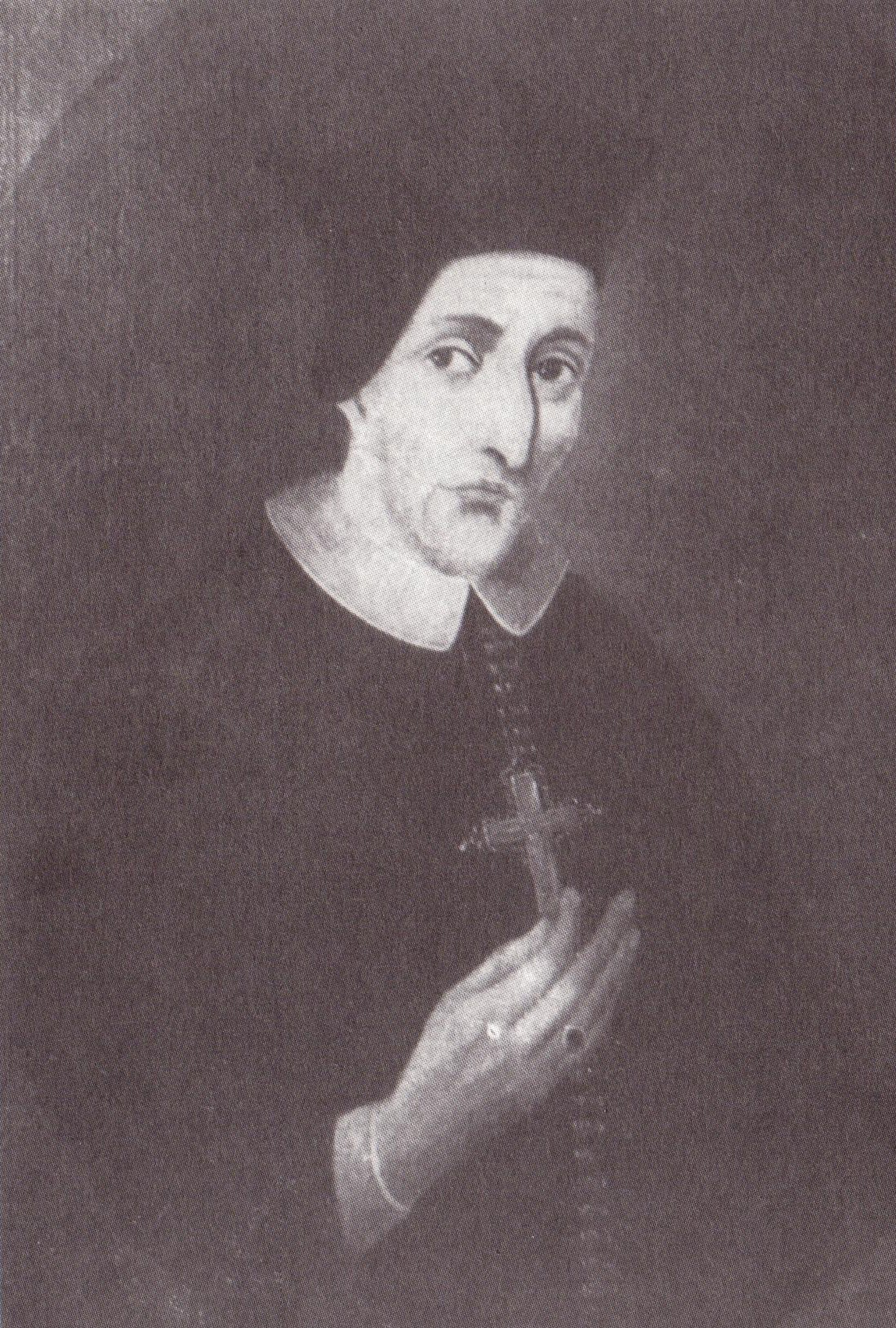
- Portrait of Steno as bishop (1685/86)
- See: Titiopolis
- Appointed: 21 August 1677 by Pope Innocent XI
- Term ended: 25 November 1686
- Predecessor: Valerio Maccioni
- Successor: Friedrich von Tietzen (Note: Friedrich von Tietzen, called Schlüter (1626–1696).)
- Other post: Titular Bishop of Titiopolis
- Previous post: Auxiliary Bishop of Münster (1680–1683)

Orders
- Ordination: 13 April 1675
- Consecration: 19 September 1677 by Saint Gregorio Barbarigo

Personal details
- Born: Niels Steensen; 1 January 1638 [NS: 11 January 1638] Copenhagen, Denmark-Norway
- Died: 25 November 1686 (aged 48) [NS: 5 December 1686] Schwerin, Duchy of Mecklenburg-Schwerin
- Buried: Basilica of San Lorenzo, Florence, Duchy of Florence
- Denomination: Lutheran (1638–1667), Roman Catholic (1667–1686)
- Parents: Father: Steen Pedersen; Mother: Anne Nielsdatter
- Occupation: Scientist: anatomy, paleontology, stratigraphy, geology; Bishop: Apostolic Vicar for Scandinavia and Northern Germany
- Coat of arms: Niels Steensen's coat of arms

Sainthood
- Feast day: 5 December
- Venerated in: Roman Catholic Church (Denmark & Germany)
- Title as Saint: Bishop
- Beatified: 23 October 1988; Vatican City, by Pope John Paul II

Niels Steensen (Danish: Niels Steensen; Latinized to Nicolas Steno (Note: Steno took his surname from his father's given name. In accordance with the academic customs of his time, Nicolas latinized the Danish form of his name Niels Ste(e)nsen as Nicolaus Stenonis. The English form, Steno, is due to an error in parsing the Latin.) or Nicolaus Stenonius; (Note: Also known as Nikolaus or Nils Steensen, Stens.) 1 January 1638 – 25 November 1686 [NS: 11 January 1638 – 5 December 1686]) was a Danish scientist, a pioneer in both anatomy and geology who became a Catholic bishop in his later years. He has been beatified by the Catholic Church.

Steensen was trained in the classical texts on science; however, by 1659, he seriously questioned accepted knowledge of the natural world. Importantly he questioned explanations for tear production, the idea that fossils grew in the ground and explanations of rock formation. His investigations and his subsequent conclusions on fossils and rock formation have led scholars to consider him one of the founders of modern stratigraphy and modern geology. The importance of Steensen's foundational contributions to geology may be gauged from the fact that half of the twenty papers in a 2009 miscellany volume on The Revolution in Geology from the Renaissance to the Enlightenment focus on Steensen, the "preeminent Baroque polymath and founder of modern geologic thought".

Born to a Lutheran family, Steensen converted to Catholicism in 1667. After his conversion, his interest in the natural sciences rapidly waned giving way to his interest in theology. At the beginning of 1675, he decided to become a priest. Four months later, he was ordained in the Catholic clergy on Easter Sunday in 1675. As a clergyman, he was later appointed Vicar Apostolic of Nordic Missions and Titular Bishop of Titopolis by Pope Innocent XI. Steensen played an active role in the Counter-Reformation in Northern Germany.

His canonization process began in 1938 and Pope John Paul II beatified Steensen in 1988.

== Early life and career ==
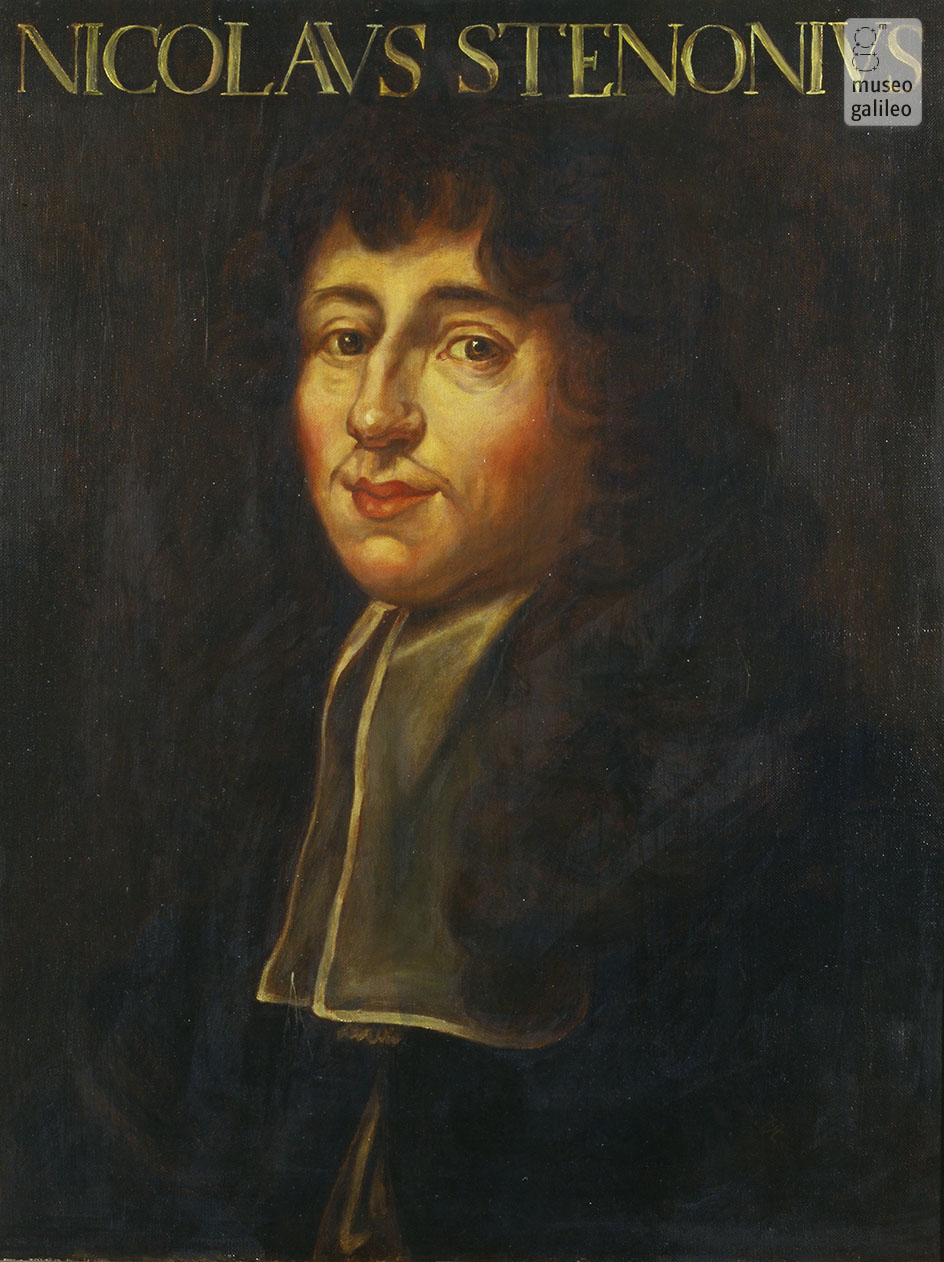
Portrait of Niels Steensen (1666–1677). Unsigned but attributed to court painter Justus Sustermans. (Uffizi Gallery, Florence, Italy).

Niels Steensen was born in Copenhagen on New Year's Day 1638 (Julian calendar), the son of a Lutheran goldsmith who worked regularly for King Christian IV of Denmark. He became ill at age three, suffering from an unknown disease, and grew up in isolation during his childhood. In 1644 his father died, after which his mother married another goldsmith. In 1654–1655, 240 pupils of his school died due to the plague. Across the street lived Peder Schumacher (who would offer Steensen a post as professor in Copenhagen in 1671). At the age of 19, Steensen entered the University of Copenhagen to pursue medical studies. After completing his university education, Steensen set out to travel through Europe; in fact, he would be on the move for the rest of his life. In the Netherlands, France, Italy and Germany he came into contact with prominent physicians and scientists. These influences led him to use his own powers of observation to make important scientific discoveries.

At the urging of Thomas Bartholin, Steensen first travelled to Rostock, then to Amsterdam, where he studied anatomy under and lodged with Gerard Blasius, focusing on the lymphatic system. Within a few months Steensen moved to Leiden, where he met the students Jan Swammerdam, Frederik Ruysch, Reinier de Graaf, Franciscus de le Boe Sylvius, a famous professor, and Baruch Spinoza. Steensen doubted Descartes's recently published explanation of the origin of tears as produced by the brain. Invited to Paris by Henri Louis Habert de Montmor and Pierre Bourdelot, he there met Ole Borch and Melchisédech Thévenot who were interested in new research and in demonstrations of his skills. In 1665 Steensen travelled to Saumur, Bordeaux and Montpellier, where he met Martin Lister and William Croone, who introduced Steensen's work to the Royal Society.

After travelling through France, he settled in Italy in 1666 – at first as professor of anatomy at the University of Padua and then in Florence as in-house physician of Grand Duke of Tuscany Ferdinando II de' Medici, who supported arts and science and whom Steensen had met in Pisa. Steensen was invited to live in the Palazzo Vecchio; in return he had to gather a cabinet of curiosities. Steensen went to Rome and met Pope Alexander VII and Marcello Malpighi, whom he admired. On his way back he watched a Corpus Christi procession in Livorno and wondered if he had the right belief.

== Scientific contributions ==
=== Anatomy ===
During his stay in Amsterdam, Steensen discovered a previously undescribed structure, the "ductus Stenonis" (the duct of the parotid salivary gland) in sheep, dog and rabbit heads. A dispute with Blasius over credit for the discovery arose, but Steensen's name remained associated with this structure known today as the Stensen's duct. In Leiden, Steensen studied the boiled heart of a cow, and determined that it was an ordinary muscle. and not the center of warmth as Galenus and Descartes believed. In Florence, Steensen focused on the muscular system and the nature of muscle contraction. He became a member of Accademia del Cimento and had long discussions with Francesco Redi. Like Vincenzo Viviani, Steensen proposed a geometrical model of muscles to show that a contracting muscle changes its shape but not its volume.

Steensen was the first to describe the lateral line system in fish.

=== Paleontology ===
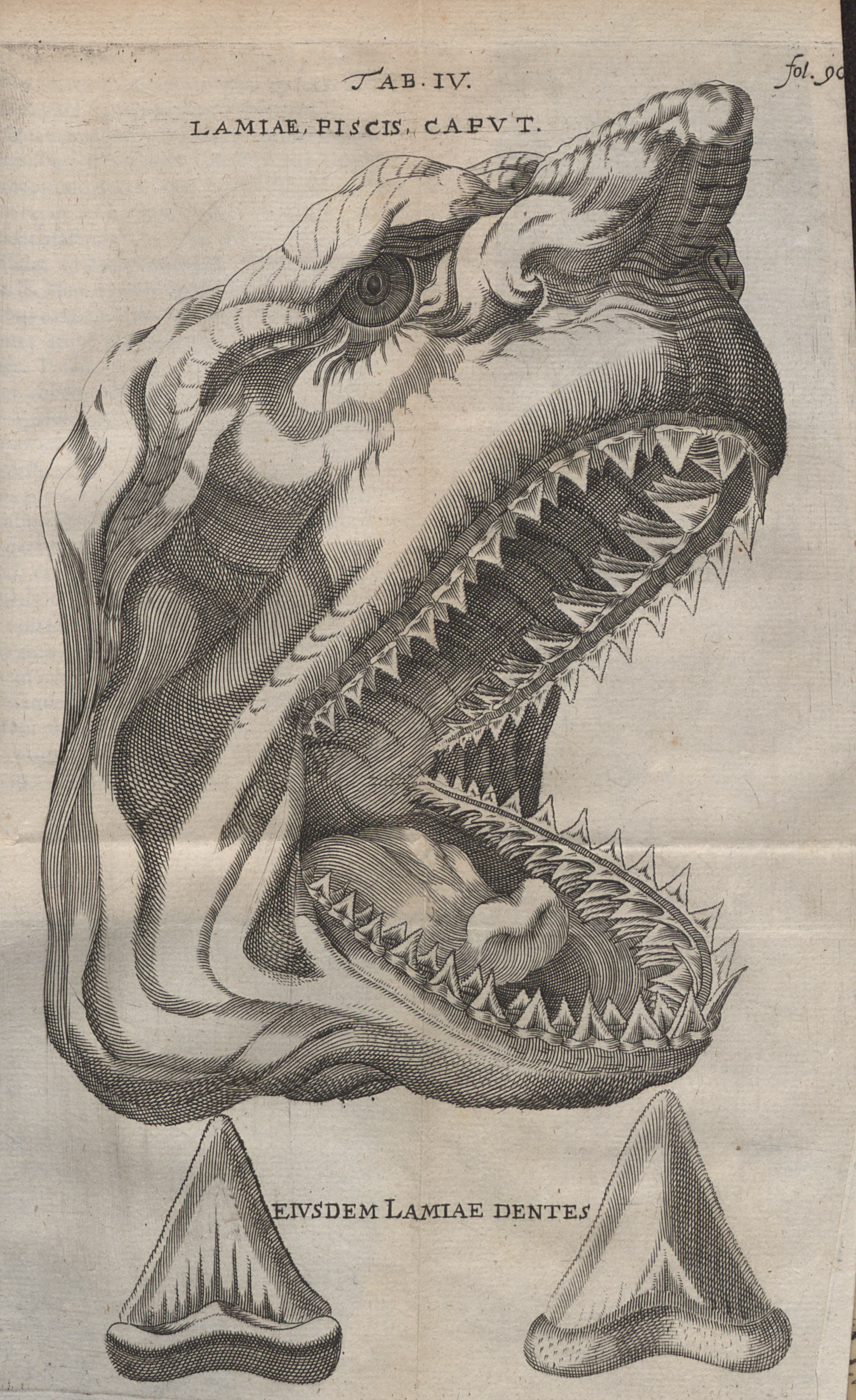
Elementorum myologiae specimen: Illustration from Steensen's 1667 paper comparing the teeth of a shark head with a fossil tooth.

In October 1666, two fishermen caught a huge female shark near the town of Livorno, and Ferdinando II de' Medici, Grand Duke of Tuscany, ordered its head to be sent to Steensen. Steensen dissected the head and published his findings in 1667. He noted that the shark's teeth bore a striking resemblance to certain stony objects, found embedded within rock formations, that his learned contemporaries were calling glossopetrae or "tongue stones". Ancient authorities, such as the Roman author Pliny the Elder, in his Naturalis Historia, had suggested that these stones fell from the sky or from the Moon. Others were of the opinion, also following ancient authors, that fossils naturally grew in the rocks. Steensen's contemporary Athanasius Kircher, for example, attributed fossils to a "lapidifying virtue diffused through the whole body of the geocosm", considered an inherent characteristic of the earth – an Aristotelian approach. Fabio Colonna, however, had already shown by burning the material to show that glossopetrae were organic matter (limestone) rather than soil minerals, in his treatise De glossopetris dissertatio published in 1616. Steensen added to Colonna's theory a discussion on the differences in composition between glossopetrae and living sharks' teeth, arguing that the chemical composition of fossils could be altered without changing their form, using the contemporary corpuscular theory of matter.

Steensen's work on shark teeth led him to the question of how any solid object could come to be found inside another solid object, such as a rock or a layer of rock. The "solid bodies within solids" that attracted Steensen's interest included not only fossils, as we would define them today, but minerals, crystals, encrustations, veins, and even entire rock layers or strata. He published his geologic studies in De solido intra solidum naturaliter contento dissertationis prodromus, or Preliminary discourse to a dissertation on a solid body naturally contained within a solid in 1669. This book was his last scientific work of note. (Note: Leibnitz came to know and esteem Steensen in Hannover and expressed deep regrets that he had abandoned his earlier studies.) Steensen was not the first to identify fossils as being from living organisms; his contemporary Robert Hooke also argued that fossils were the remains of once-living organisms.

=== Geology and stratigraphy ===
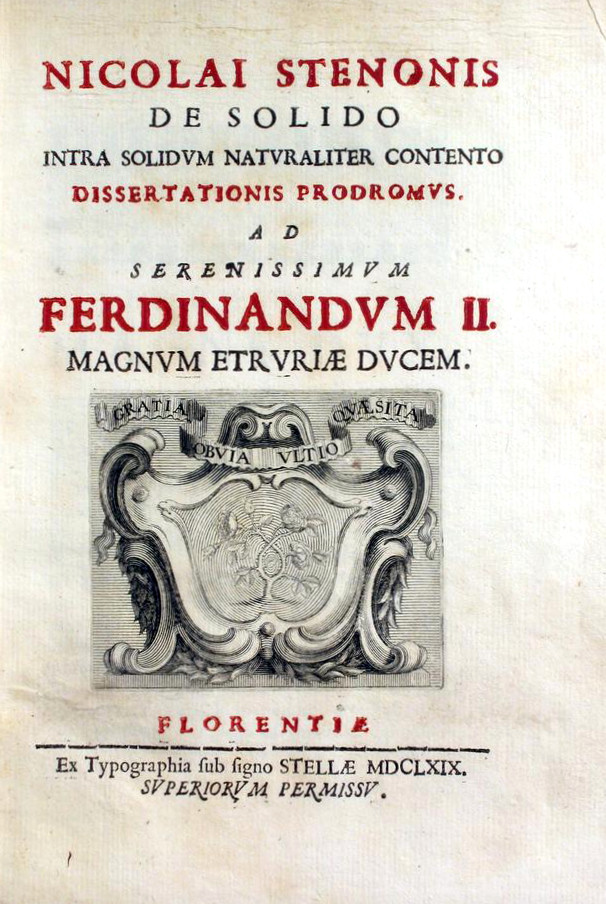
De solido intra solidum naturaliter contento dissertationis prodromus (1669)

Steensen, in his Dissertationis prodromus of 1669 is credited with four of the defining principles of the science of stratigraphy. His words were:

1. the law of superposition: "At the time when a given stratum was being formed, there was beneath it another substance which prevented the further descent of the comminuted matter and so at the time when the lowest stratum was being formed either another solid substance was beneath it, or if some fluid existed there, then it was not only of a different character from the upper fluid, but also heavier than the solid sediment of the upper fluid."
2. the principle of original horizontality: "At the time when one of the upper strata was being formed, the lower stratum had already gained the consistency of a solid."
3. the principle of lateral continuity: "At the time when any given stratum was being formed it was either encompassed on its sides by another solid substance, or it covered the entire spherical surface of the earth. Hence it follows that in whatever place the bared sides of the strata are seen, either a continuation of the same strata must be sought, or another solid substance must be found which kept the matter of the strata from dispersion."
4. the principle of cross-cutting relationships: "If a body or discontinuity cuts across a stratum, it must have formed after that stratum."

These principles were applied and extended in 1772 by Jean-Baptiste L. Romé de l'Isle. Steensen's ideas still form the basis of stratigraphy and were key in the development of James Hutton's theory of infinitely repeating cycles of seabed deposition, uplifting, erosion, and submersion.

=== Crystallography ===
Steensen gave the first accurate observations on a type of crystal in his 1669 book De solido intra solidum naturaliter contento (the Dissertationis prodromus). The principle in crystallography, known simply as Steensen's law, or the law of constancy of interfacial angles or the first law of crystallography, states that the angles between corresponding faces on crystals are the same for all specimens of the same mineral. Steensen's seminal work paved the way for the law of rational indices of French mineralogist René-Just Haüy in 1801. This fundamental breakthrough formed the basis of all subsequent inquiries into crystal structure.

== Conversion and priesthood ==
Steensen's questioning mind also influenced his religious views. Having been brought up in the Lutheran faith, he nevertheless questioned its teachings, something which became a burning issue when confronted with Catholicism while studying in Florence. After making comparative theological studies, including reading the Church Fathers and by using his natural observational skills, he decided that Catholicism, rather than Lutheranism, provided more sustenance for his constant inquisitiveness. In 1667, Steensen converted to Catholicism on All Souls' Day, influenced, among others, by Lavinia Cenami Arnolfini, a noblewoman of Lucca.

Steensen traveled to Hungary, Austria and in Spring 1670 he arrived in Amsterdam. There he met with old friends Jan Swammerdam and Reinier de Graaf. With Anna Maria van Schurman and Antoinette Bourignon he discussed scientific and religious topics. The following quote is from a 1673 speech:

Fair is what we see, Fairer what we have perceived, Fairest what is still in veil.

It is not clear if he met Nicolaes Witsen, but he did read Witsen's book on shipbuilding. In 1671 he accepted the post of professor of anatomy in the University of Copenhagen, but promised Cosimo III de' Medici he would return when he was appointed tutor to Ferdinando III de' Medici.

At the beginning of 1675, Steensen decided to continue his theological studies, which he had begun even before his conversion, toward his ordination to the priesthood. After only 4 months, he was ordained priest and celebrated his first Mass on 13 April 1675 in the Basilica of the Santissima Annunziata in Florence at the age of 37. Athanasius Kircher expressly asked what were the reasons why he decided to become priest. Steensen had left natural sciences for education and theology and became one of the leading figures in the Counter-Reformation. Upon request of Duke Johann Friedrich of Hanover, Pope Innocent XI made him Vicar Apostolic for the Nordic Missions on 21 August 1677. He was consecrated titular bishop of Titiopolis on 19 September by Cardinal Gregorio Barbarigo and moved to the Lutheran North.

In the year after he was made bishop, he was probably involved in the banning of publications by Baruch Spinoza. There he had talks with Gottfried Leibniz, the librarian; the two argued about Spinoza and his letter to Albert Burgh, then Steensen's pupil. Leibniz recommended a reunification of the churches. Steensen worked at the city of Hannover until 1680.

After John Frederick death's, Prince-Bishop of Paderborn Ferdinand of Fürstenberg appointed him as Auxiliary Bishop of Münster (Church Saint Liudger) on 7 October 1680. The new prince-elector Ernest Augustus, Elector of Hanover was a Protestant. Earlier, Augustus' wife, Sophia of Hanover, had made fun of Steensen's piousness; he had sold his bishop's ring and cross to help the needy. He continued zealously the work of counter reform begun by Bernhard von Galen.

== Death ==
In 1683, Steensen resigned as auxiliary bishop after an argument about the election of the new bishop, Maximilian Henry of Bavaria and moved in 1684 to Hamburg. There Steensen became involved again in the study of the brain and the nerve system with an old friend Dirck Kerckring. Steensen was invited to Schwerin, when it became clear he was not accepted in Hamburg. Steensen dressed like a poor man in an old cloak. He drove in an open carriage in snow and rain. Living four days a week on bread and beer, he became emaciated. (Note: On the other days there were never more than four courses plus a dessert, even though noblemen from the court often dined with him.) When Steensen had fulfilled his mission, some years of difficult tasks, he wanted to go back to Italy.

Before he could return, Steensen became severely ill, his belly swelling day by day. Steensen died in Germany, after much suffering. His corpse was shipped to Florence by Kerckring upon request of Cosimo III de' Medici and buried in the Basilica of San Lorenzo close to his protectors, the De' Medici family. In 1946 his grave was opened, and the corpse was reburied after a procession through the streets of the city.

== Beatification ==
After his death in 1686, Steensen was venerated as a saint in the diocese of Hildesheim. Steensen's piety and virtue have been evaluated with a view to an eventual canonization. His canonization process was begun in Osnabrück in 1938. In 1953 his grave in the crypt of the church of San Lorenzo was opened as part of the beatification process. His corpse was transferred to a fourth-century Christian sarcophagus found in the river Arno donated by the Italian state. His remains were placed in a lateral chapel of the church that received the name of "Capella Stenoniana". He was beatified by Pope John Paul II in 1988. His feast day is 5 December.

== Legacy ==
Steensen's life and work has been studied, in particular in relation to the developments in geology in the late nineteenth century.

- The Steensen Museum in Aarhus, Denmark, named after Niels Steensen, holds exhibitions on the history of science and medicine. It also operates a planetarium, a medicinal herb garden and the greenhouses in Aarhus Botanical Gardens.
- The Steno Medal, awarded by the Geological Society of Denmark, honors prominent geologists who have made significant contributions to Danish and Greenland geology, and is named in his honor.
- Impact craters on Mars (68.0°S 115.6°W) and the Moon are named in his honor.
- The mineral Stenonite was named in his honour.
- The Catholic parish church of Grevesmühlen, North Germany, built from 1989 to 1991, is dedicated to Niels Steensen.
- In 1950 the "Niels Steensens Gymnasium", a Catholic preparatory school, was founded by the Jesuit Order in Copenhagen.
- Steno Diabetes Center, a research and teaching hospital dedicated to diabetes in Gentofte, Denmark, was named after Niels Steensen.
- The Istituto Niels Stensen was founded in 1964 in Florence, Italy. Administered by the Jesuit Order, it is dedicated to his memory.
- On 11 January 2012, Steensen was commemorated with a Google doodle as the founder of geology.

== Major works ==
- Steensen, Niels / Sténon, Niels. Nicolai Stenonis Observationes anatomicae quibus varia oris, oculorum et narium vasa describuntur, novique salivae, lacrymarum et muci fontes deteguntur, et novum nobilissimi Bilsii de lymphae motu et usu commentum examinatur et rejicitur, Lugduni Batavorum: apud J. Chouet, (1662) via Bibliothèque interuniversitaire de médecine (Paris)
- Steensen, Niels /Steensen, Niels. Nicolai Stenonis De Musculis et glandulis observationum specimen, cum epistolis duabus anatomicis, Hafniae: lit. M. Godicchenii, (1664). via Bibliothèque interuniversitaire de médecine (Paris)
- Nicolai Steensennis Elementorum Myologiae Specimen, seu Musculi Descriptio Geometrica, cui accedunt canis carchariae dissectum caput et dissectus piscis ex canum genere... Florentiae : ex typ. sub signo Stellae, (1667) via Bibliothèque interuniversitaire de médecine (Paris).
- Discours de M. Stenon sur l'anatomie du cerveau..., R. de Ninville (Paris), 1669 via Gallica
- Nicolai Stenonis solido intra solidum naturaliter contento dissertationis prodromus ... Florentiae : ex typographia sub signo Stellae (1669), via Google Books The Prodromus of Nicolaus Steno's Dissertation concerning a solid body enclosed by process of nature within a solid; an English version with an introduction and explanatory notes by John Garrett Winter, New York: Macmillan Company, (1916) via the Internet Archive
- Nicolai Stenonis ad novae philosophiae reformatorem de vera philosophia epistola, Florentiae, 1675 (letter to Spinoza)
- Nicolai Stenonis Opera philosophica, edited by Wilhelm Maar... vol. I, Copenhagen : V. Tryde, (1910) via Gallica
- Nicolai Stenonis Opera philosophica, edited by Wilhelm Maar... vol. II, Copenhagen : V. Tryde, (1910)
