= Law of rational indices =

Law of crystallography

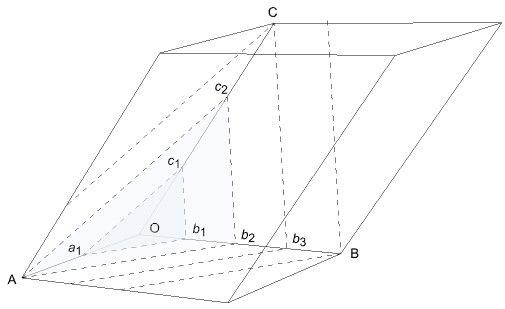
Parallel equidistant planes divide the axis OA into an integral number of equal intercepts, Oa_{1}, a_{1}a_{2}, etc., and the same holds for OB and OC. If OA is divided into h parts, OB into k parts, and OC into l parts, the planes (a_{1}b_{1}c_{1}, a_{2}b_{2}c_{2}, etc.) are identified by the Miller indices (hkl). The diagram shows plane (243).

The law of rational indices is an empirical law in the field of crystallography concerning crystal structure. The law states that "when referred to three intersecting axes all faces occurring on a crystal can be described by numerical indices which are integers, and that these integers are usually small numbers." The law is also named the law of rational intercepts or the second law of crystallography.

== Definition ==
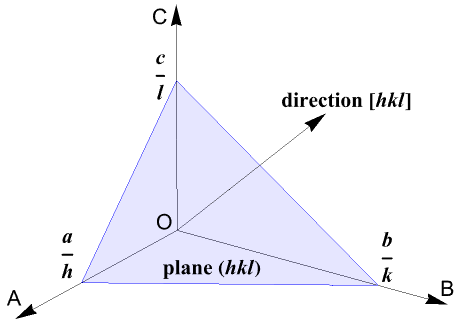
Miller indices of a plane (hkl) and a direction [hkl]. The intercepts on the axes are at a/h, b/k and c/l.

The International Union of Crystallography (IUCr) gives the following definition: "The law of rational indices states that the intercepts, OP, OQ, OR, of the natural faces of a crystal form with the unit-cell axes a, b, c are inversely proportional to prime integers, h, k, l. They are called the Miller indices of the face. They are usually small because the corresponding lattice planes are among the densest and have therefore a high interplanar spacing and low indices."

== History ==
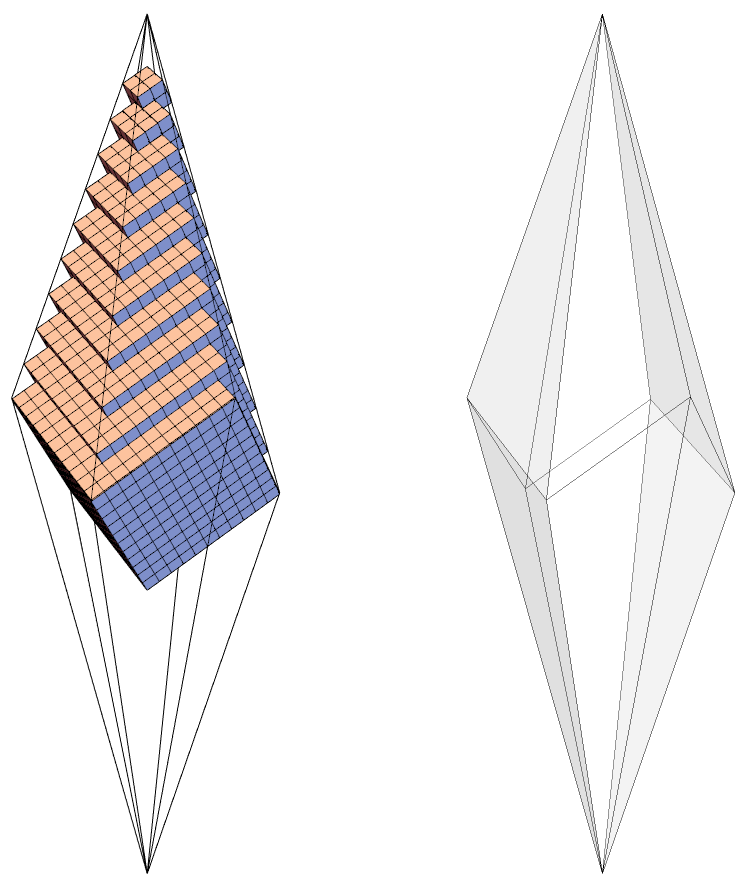
Calcite scalenohedron crystal constructed from small building blocks (molécules intégrantes) using the method of René Just Haüy (1801) in his Traité de Minéralogie.

The law of constancy of interfacial angles, first observed by Nicolas Steno, (De solido intra solidum naturaliter contento, Florence, 1669), and firmly established by Jean-Baptiste Romé de l'Isle (Cristallographie, Paris, 1783), was a precursor to the law of rational indices.

René Just Haüy showed in 1784 that the known interfacial angles could be accounted for if a crystal were made up of minute building blocks (molécules intégrantes), such as cubes, parallelepipeds, or rhombohedra. The 'rise-to-run' ratio of the stepped faces of the crystal was a simple rational number p/q, where p and q are small multiples of units of length (generally different and not more than 6). Haüy's method is named the law of decrements, law of simple rational truncations, or Haüy's law. The law of rational indices was not stated in its modern form by Haüy, but it is directly implied by his law of decrements.

In 1830, Johann Hessel proved that, as a consequence of the law of rational indices, morphological forms can combine to give exactly 32 kinds of crystal symmetry in Euclidean space, since only two-, three-, four-, and six-fold rotation axes can occur. However, Hessel's work remained practically unknown for over 60 years and, in 1867, Axel Gadolin independently rediscovered his results.

Miller indices were introduced in 1839 by the British mineralogist William Hallowes Miller, although a similar system (Weiss parameters) had already been used by the German mineralogist Christian Samuel Weiss since 1817.

In 1866, Auguste Bravais showed that crystals preferentially cleaved parallel to lattice planes of high density. This is sometimes referred to as Bravais's law or the law of reticular density and is an equivalent statement to the law of rational indices.

== Crystal structure ==
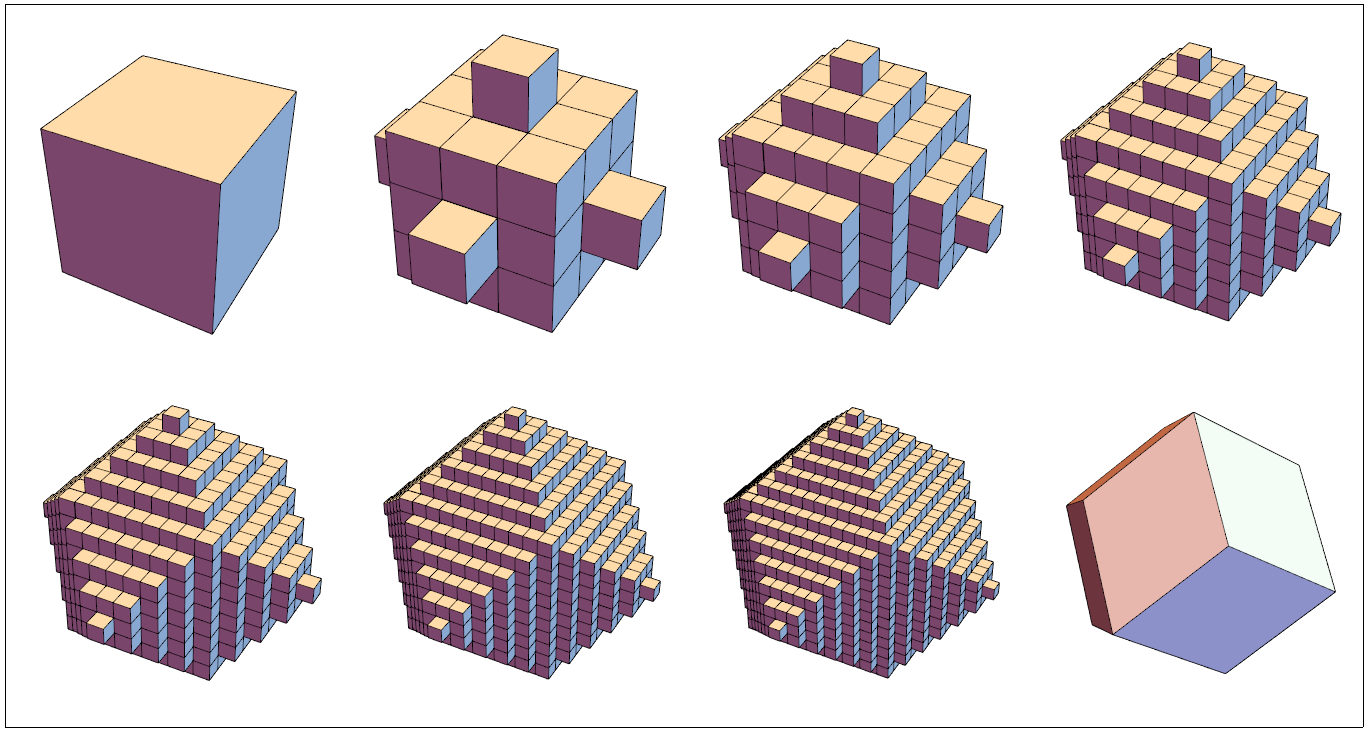
Rhombic dodecahedron assembled from progressively smaller cubic building blocks. Garnet has this crystal habit with {110} crystal faces.

The law of rational indices is implied by the three-dimensional lattice structure of crystals. A crystal structure is periodic, and invariant under translations in three linearly independent directions.

Quasicrystals do not have translational symmetry, and therefore do not obey the law of rational indices.

== See also ==
- Geometrical crystallography before X-rays
- Law of constancy of interfacial angles
- Law of symmetry (crystallography)
