= Law of constancy of interfacial angles =

Law of crystallography

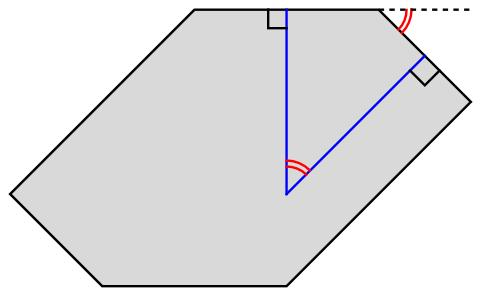
The interfacial angle (red), is the angle between the normals (blue) to the two crystal faces.

The law of constancy of interfacial angles (German: Das Gesetz der Winkelkonstanz; French: Loi de constance des angles) is an empirical law in the fields of crystallography and mineralogy concerning the shape, or morphology, of crystals. The law states that the angles between adjacent corresponding faces of crystals of a particular substance are always constant despite the different shapes, sizes, and mode of growth of crystals. The law is also named the first law of crystallography or Steno's law.

== Definition ==
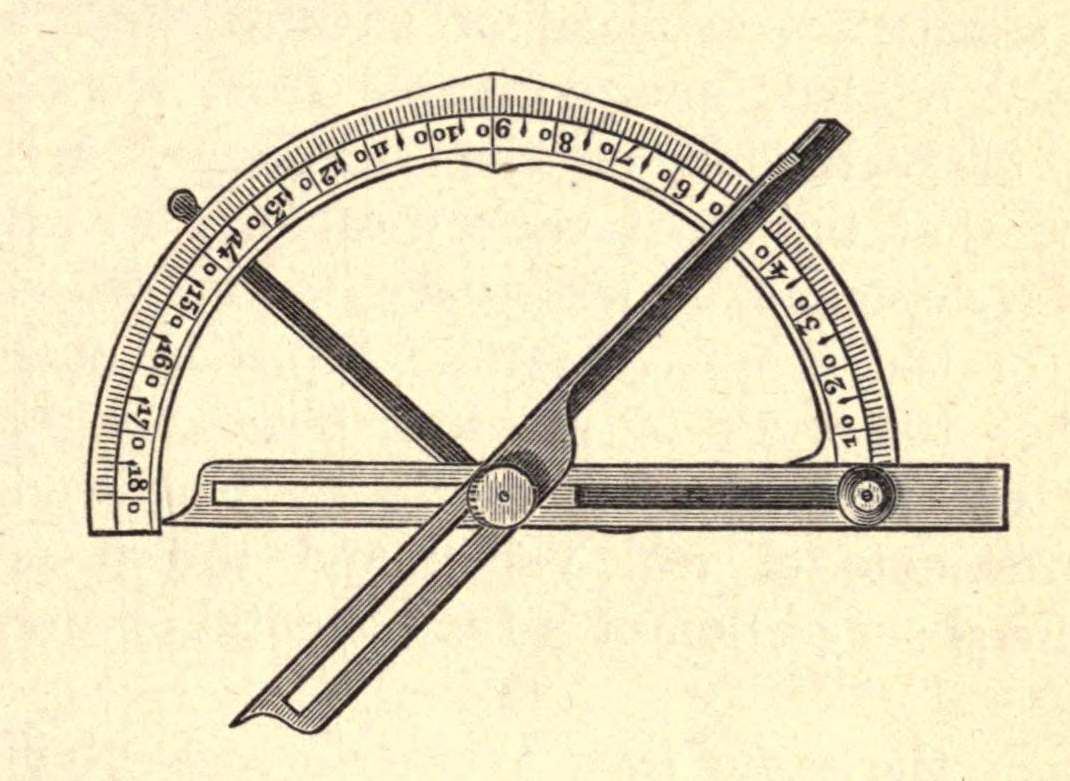
The contact goniometer was the first instrument used to measure the interfacial angles of crystals

The International Union of Crystallography (IUCr) gives the following definition: "The law of the constancy of interfacial angles (or 'first law of crystallography') states that the angles between the crystal faces of a given species are constant, whatever the lateral extension of these faces and the origin of the crystal, and are characteristic of that species." The law is valid at constant temperature and pressure.

This law is important in identifying different mineral species as small changes in atomic structure can lead to large differences in the angles between crystal faces.

Mathematically, the sum of the interfacial angle (external angle) and the dihedral angle (internal angle) between two adjacent faces sharing a common edge is π radians (180°).

== History ==
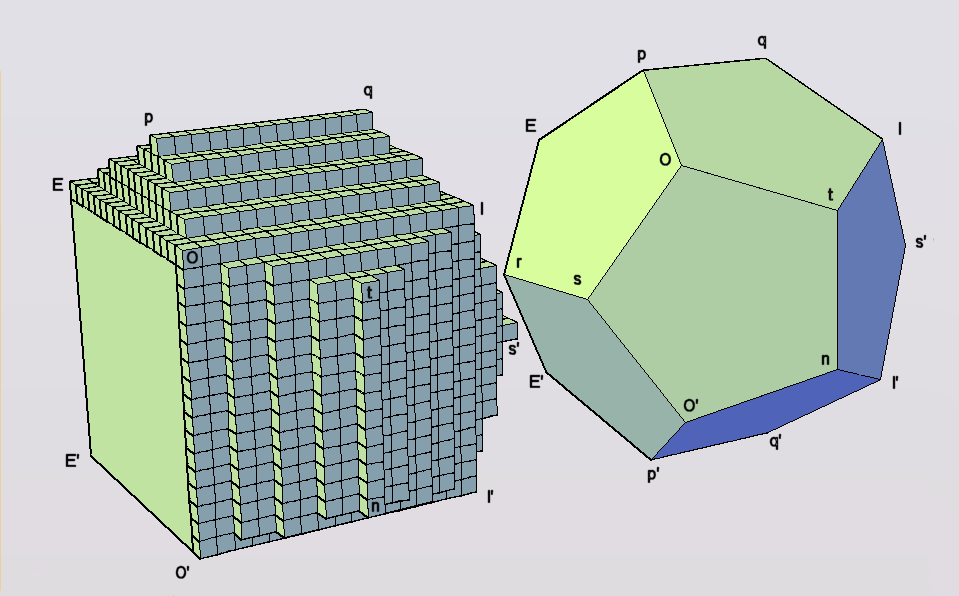
Dodecahedron built from smaller cubical units

The law of the constancy of interfacial angles was first observed by the Danish physician Nicolas Steno when studying quartz crystals (De solido intra solidum naturaliter contento, Florence, 1669), who noted that, although the crystals differed in appearance from one to another, the angles between corresponding faces were always the same.

The law was also observed by Domenico Guglielmini (Riflessioni filosofiche dedotte dalle figure de Sali, Bologna, 1688), but it was generalized and firmly established by Jean-Baptiste Romé de l'Isle (Cristallographie, Paris, 1783) who accurately measured the interfacial angles of a great variety of crystals, using the goniometer designed by Arnould Carangeot and noted that the angles are characteristic of a substance. Carangeot was a student of Romé de L’Isle at the time of his invention of the basic crystallographic measuring instrument.

A French crystallographer, René Just Haüy, showed in 1784 that the known interfacial angles could be accounted for if the crystal were made up of minute building blocks (molécules intégrantes) that correspond approximately to the present-day unit cells.

In the diagram, the green dodecahedron on the left is built from cubical units, with the faces having a Miller index of (210). Unlike the regular dodecahedron on the right, its faces are not regular pentagons, but they are close to regular in appearance. The piling of the cubical units forms the pentagonal dodecahedron of pyritohedral pyrite. The decrement of the layers is in the proportion of 2:1, which leads to a dihedral angle at the top edge pq of 126° 87′, closely corresponding to that of the empirical crystal, of 127° 56′. The diagram is based on an 1801 drawing by René Just Haüy.

== Crystal structure ==
Crystal faces vary in their underlying lattice density. Three faces are shown with their Miller indices

The phenomenon of the constancy of interfacial angles is important because it is an outward sign of the inherent symmetry and ordered arrangement of atoms, ions or molecules within a crystal structure. The faces of a crystal are parallel to the planes of the crystal lattice, and it is for this reason that the interfacial angles are the same in different crystal specimens.

The angles between the various faces of a crystal remain unchanged throughout its growth. Crystals grow by addition of material to existing faces, this material being deposited parallel to the already existing surfaces. Consequently, if more material is added to one face than to another, the faces become unalike in size and shape, nevertheless the interfacial angles between them remain the same.

Crystals generally exhibit anisotropy, that is their properties are dependent on their direction. In particular, crystals cleave in specific directions, namely those parallel to the planes of the lattice structure. Cleavage preferentially occurs parallel to higher density planes with low Miller indices.

== See also ==
- Geometrical crystallography before X-rays
- Law of rational indices
- Law of symmetry (crystallography)
