= Jean-Baptiste L. Romé de l'Isle =

French geologist (1736–1790)

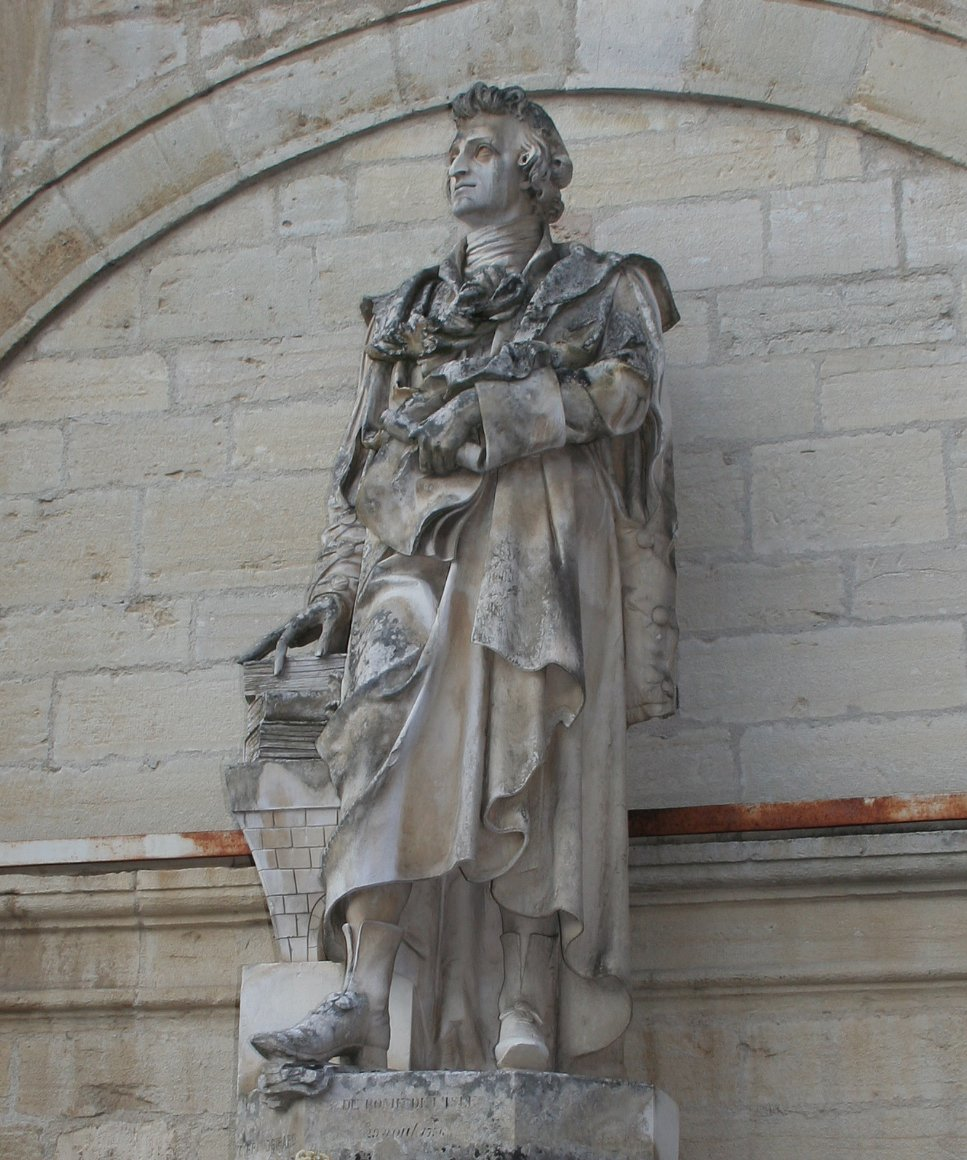
Statue of Jean-Baptiste Romé de l'Isle at the city hall of his birthplace, Gray, Haute-Saône

Jean-Baptiste Louis Romé de l'Isle (26 August 1736 – 3 July 1790) was a French mineralogist, considered one of the creators of modern crystallography.

Romé was born in Gray, Haute-Saône, in eastern France. As secretary of a company of artillery in the Carnatic Wars he visited the East Indies, was taken prisoner by the English in 1761, and held in captivity for several years. He was also an alumnus of the Collège Sainte-Barbe in Paris.

Subsequently, he became distinguished for his researches on mineralogy and crystallography. He was the author of Essai de Cristallographie (1772), the second edition of which, regarded as his principal work, was published as Cristallographie (3 vols. and atlas, 1783). His formulation of the law of constancy of interfacial angles built on observations by the geologist Nicolaus Steno.

In 1775, he was elected a foreign member of the Royal Swedish Academy of Sciences. He died in Paris, France on 3 July 1790.

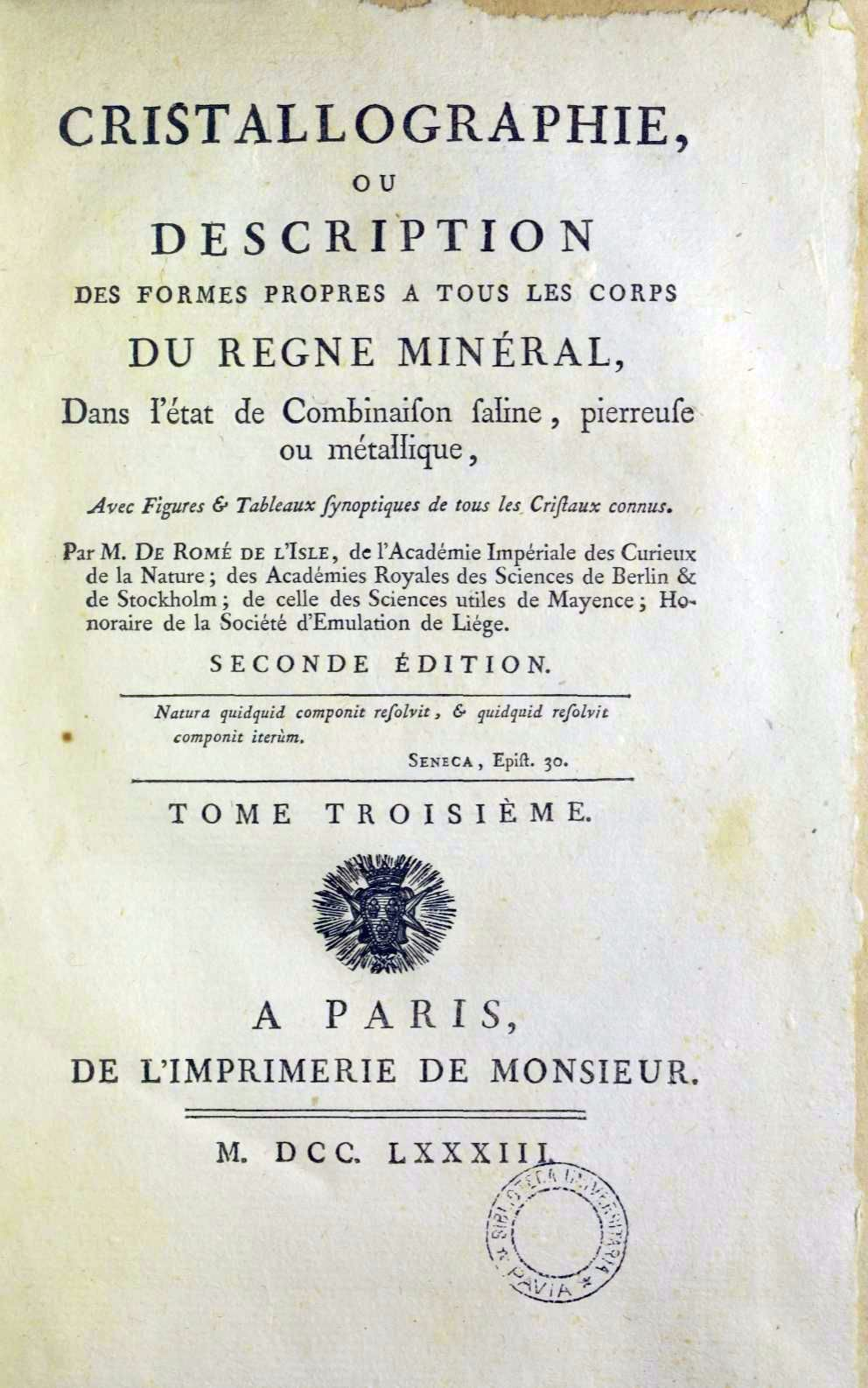
Cristallographie, 1783

== See also ==
- Chemical crystallography before X-rays
- Geometrical crystallography before X-rays

== Works ==
- Cristallographie (in French). Vol. 3. Paris: Imprimerie de Monsieur. 1783.
- Cristallographie (in French). Vol. 4. Paris: Imprimerie de Monsieur. 1783.
