= René Just Haüy =

French priest and mineralogist (1742–1822)

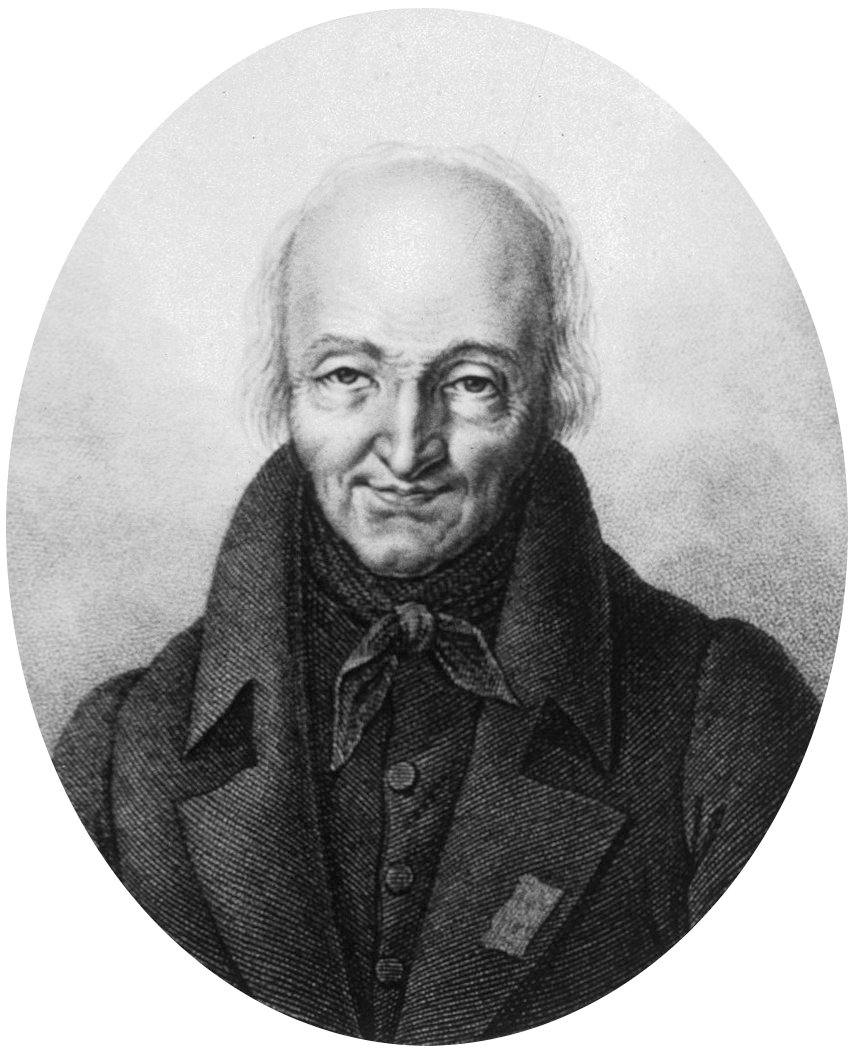
- Born: 28 February 1743; Saint-Just-en-Chaussée, France
- Died: 1 June 1822 (aged 79); Paris, France
- Scientific career
- Fields: Mineralogy; Crystallography

René Just Haüy (French pronunciation: [aɥi]) FRS MWS FRSE (28 February 1743 – 1 June 1822) was a French priest and mineralogist, commonly styled the Abbé Haüy after he was made an honorary canon of Notre Dame. Due to his innovative work on crystal structure and his four-volume Traité de Minéralogie (1801), he is often referred to as the "Father of Modern Crystallography". Haüy’s periodic model (1784), based on the concept of integrant molecules, was an early attempt to account for the regular structure of crystals. During the French Revolution he also helped to establish the metric system.

== Biography ==
=== Early life ===
René-Just Haüy was born at Saint-Just-en-Chaussée on February 28, 1743, in the province of Picardy (later the département of Oise). His parents were Just Haüy, a poor linen-weaver, and Magdeleine Candelot.

Haüy's interest in the services and music of the local church brought him to the attention of the prior of a nearby abbey of Premonstrants. Through him, Haüy was introduced to a colleague in Paris and obtained a scholarship to the College of Navarre. Haüy eventually became an usher, and in 1764, was appointed regent (master) of the fourth class.

Haüy also progressed in his religious training. He was tonsured in 1762, took minor orders in 1765, was appointed a subdeacon in 1767, became a deacon in 1769, and was ordained as a Roman Catholic priest in 1770.

After his ordination, Haüy became regent (teacher) of the second class at the Collège du Cardinal-Lemoine. Through his friendship with his spiritual director, Abbé Lhomond, Haüy became interested first in botany, and after hearing a lecture by Louis-Jean-Marie Daubenton, in mineralogy.

His brother Valentin Haüy was the founder of the first school for the blind, the Institution des Jeunes Aveugles (Institute for Blind Youth) in Paris.

=== Crystallography ===
An accident apparently directed René-Just Haüy's attention to what became a new field in natural history, crystallography. Haüy was examining a broken specimen of calcareous spar in the collection of Jacques de France de Croisset. (According to some accounts, Haüy dropped the specimen and caused it to break.) He became intrigued by the perfectly smooth plane of the fracture.

"The observation I have just noted is that which has served to develop my ideas on the structure of crystals. It presented itself in the case of a crystal that the citizen Defrance was kind enough to give me just after it had broken off from a group this enlightened amateur was showing me, and which formed part of his mineralogical collection. The prism had a single fracture along one of the edges of the base, by which it had been attached to the rest of the group. Instead of placing it in the collection I was then forming, I tried to divide it in other directions, and I succeeded, after several attempts, in extracting its rhomboid nucleus." René-Just Haüy, Traité de minéralogie (1801)

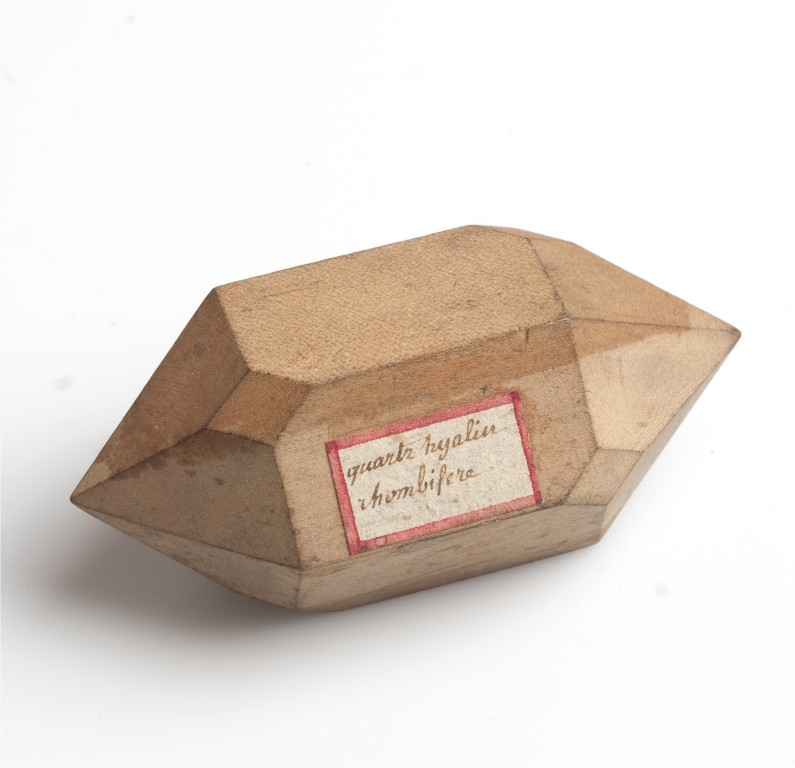
Pearwood model of rock crystal rhomboid, made by René-Just Haüy, Teylers Museum

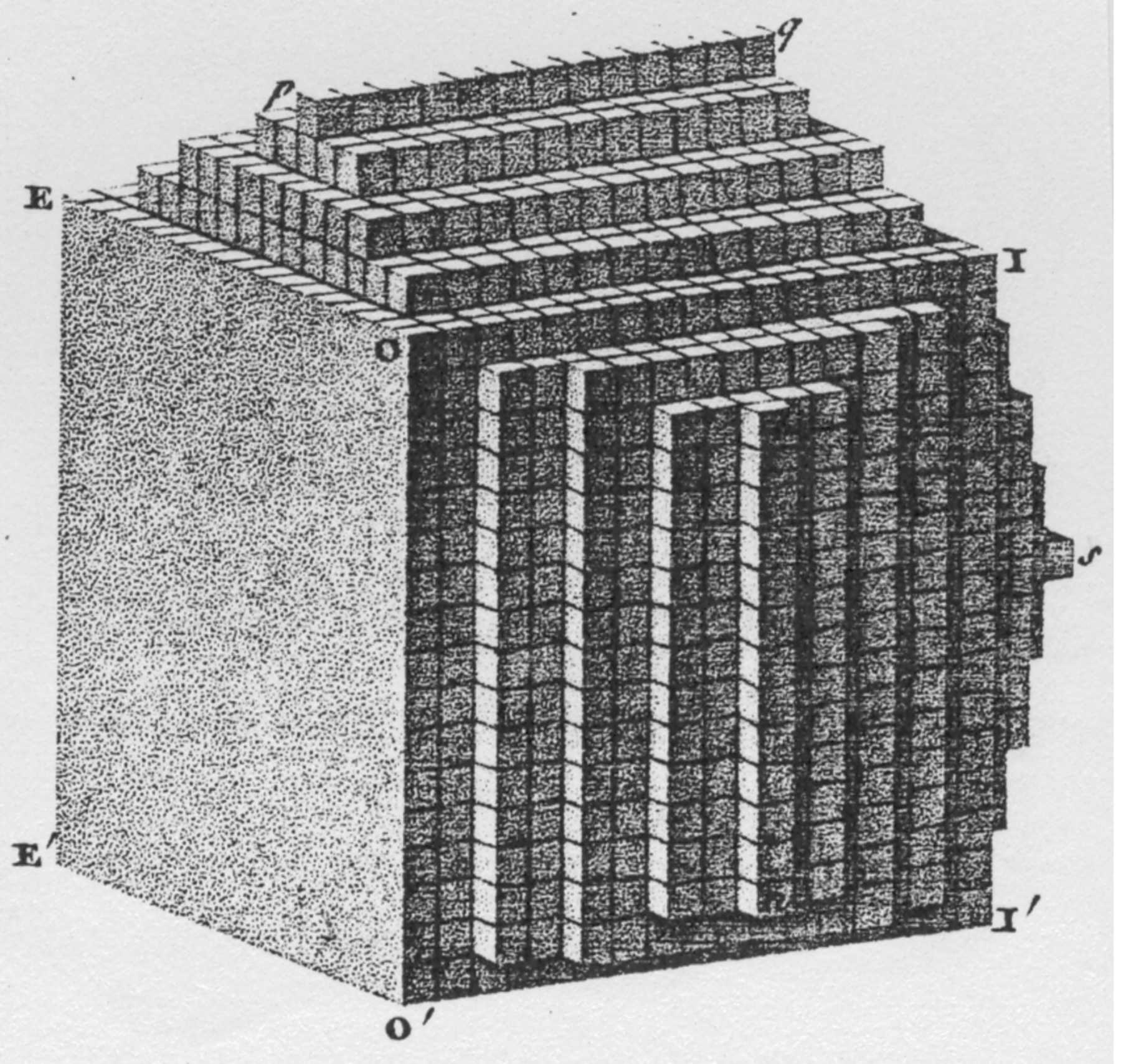
Integrant molecules form a pentagonal dodecahedron of pyrite, Traité de minéralogie (1801)

Studying the fragments inspired Haüy to make further experiments in crystal cutting. Breaking down crystals to the smallest pieces possible, Haüy concluded that each type of crystal has a fundamental primitive, nucleus or “integrant molecule” of a particular shape, that could not be broken further without destroying both the physical and chemical nature of the crystal. He further argued that crystal structures are made up of orderly arrangements of these integrant molecules in successive layers, according to geometrical laws of crystallization. Crystals that had been classed together previously were identified as being of separate mineral species if their fundamental structure differed. Heavyspar, for example, was differentiated into specimens containing barium and strontium. The value of Haüy's discovery was immediately recognized.

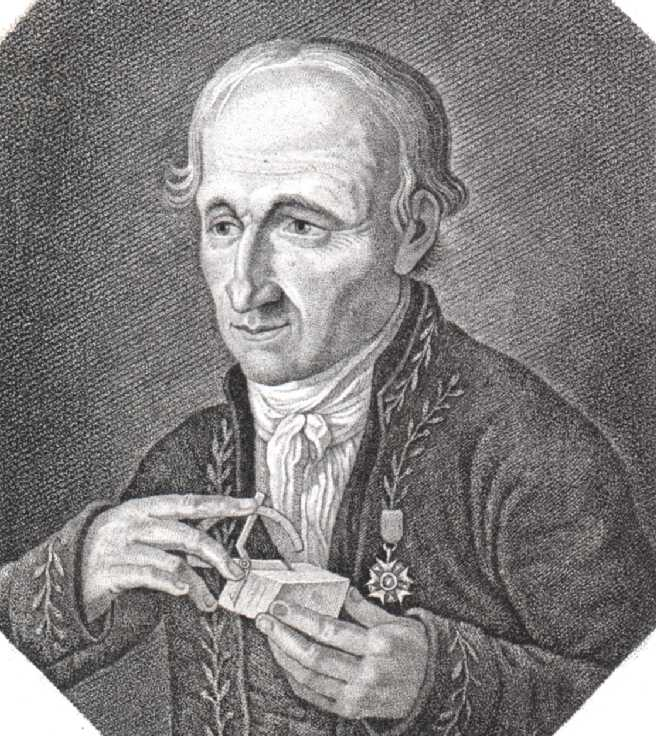
Haüy with a contact goniometer, ca. 1812

Haüy and his contemporaries worked with limited evidence. They could observe a crystal's habit and cleavage planes and measure interfacial angles with an instrument called a goniometer. The internal structure underlying the crystal's integrant molecule would not be determinable until the development of X-Ray diffraction technology many years later, in 1902. Haüy was not the only researcher to observe that calcite crystals could be composed of smaller rhombohedra, but it was he who introduced the idea of triple periodicity in crystals. This idea was fundamental to later developments in the field on crystal lattices.

Between 1784 and 1822, Haüy published more than 100 reports discussing his theories and their application to the structure of crystalline substances. Haüy first stated his law of decrement in Essai d'une théorie sur la structure des crystaux (1784). It was a radical departure from his previous works, introducing his theory of molé constituantes or constituent molecules. By 1792, he had identified a number of parallelepipeds as possible primitive crystal forms. Haüy first lectured about his law of symmetry in 1795 but it was not until 1815 that it was finally published. Haüy worked out the mathematical theory of his work in his Traité de minéralogie (1801), which became a classic in the field. By then, Haüy had applied his ideas to the differentiation of different species. He systematically described all the known minerals, sorting them into classes, and giving their chemical and geometrical properties. His work, in four volumes, including an atlas of plates, was accounted among the most wonderful of the 19th century. It has been described as "a work of comprehensive insight, and much of it, written with literary fluency". A second updated edition appeared as Traité de cristallographie in 1822.

Haüy created comprehensive collections containing hundreds of pear-wood models of crystal models for education and demonstrations. One such set was acquired by Martin van Marum, curator of the Teylers Museum and a director of the Hollandsche Maatschappij der Wetenschappen.

Haüy is also known for his observations on pyroelectricity. He detected pyroelectricity in calamine, an oxide of zinc, as early as 1785. He studied pyroelectricity in a number of other minerals including tourmaline and related them to crystalline structure. He showed that electricity in tourmaline was strongest at the poles of the crystal and became imperceptible at the middle. Haüy published a book on electricity and magnetism, Exposition raisonné de la théorie de l'électricité et du magnétisme, d'après les principes d'Æpinus, in 1787.

On February 12, 1783, Haüy was elected to the Académie royale des sciences de Paris (French Academy of Sciences) with the rank of an adjoint in botany, there being no vacancy in either physics or mineralogy. In 1788, he became as an associate in natural history and mineralogy.

=== French Revolution ===
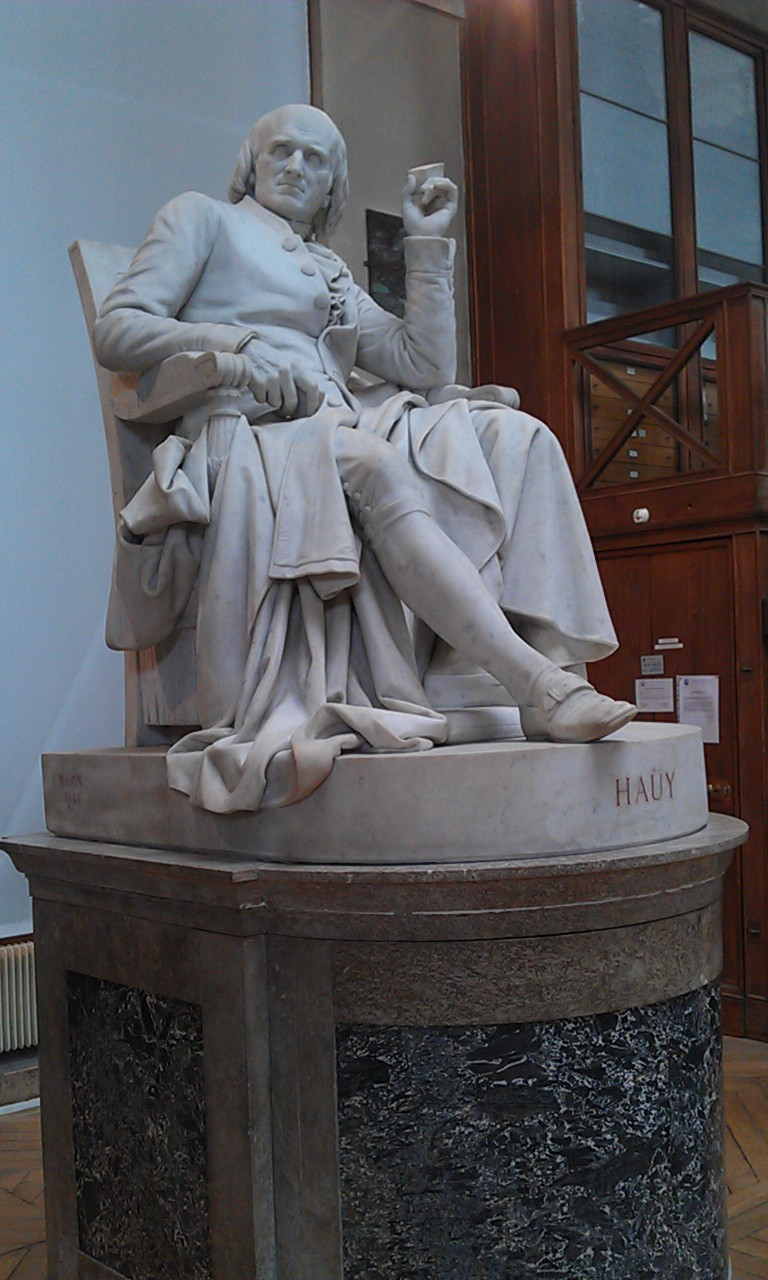
René Just Haüy, statue by Isidore Hippolyte Brion at the National Museum of Natural History in Paris

During the French Revolution, Haüy refused to take an oath accepting the Civil Constitution of the Clergy, and became a non-juring priest. He was thrown into prison after the monarchy was overthrown on August 10, 1792. Étienne Geoffroy Saint-Hilaire interceded on his behalf. Haüy was released just a few days before the September Massacres of September 2–7, 1792 in which many of the clergy were killed.

On August 8, 1793, in spite of the efforts of Antoine Lavoisier, the Académie royale des sciences de Paris was dissolved by the National Convention. It was not restored until August 22, 1795, when it became known as the Institut National des Sciences et des Arts (National Institute of Sciences and Arts).

Before its suppression, the Academy of Sciences had formed a working group to develop a uniform system of weights and measures for use throughout France. Lavoisier was a major proponent, and on March 30, 1791, he submitted a plan on behalf of the Commission on Weights and Measures, which was adopted by the Constituent Assembly. Lavoisier and Haüy were tasked with determining the density of water. As of January 4, 1793, they determined the weight of a cubic decimeter of distilled water at the temperature of melting ice, the kilogram.

On August 1, 1793, the National Convention passed a decree, in favor of developing uniform weights and measures across France. On September 11, 1793, they established a Temporary Commission of Weights and Measures made up of twelve scientists, including Haüy, whose task was to carry out the decree.

The work of the commission was disrupted by political events. In November 1793, Lavoisier and several others were arrested and removed from the Commission. On May 8, 1794, Lavoisier was guillotined. Nonetheless, Haüy remained secretary of the Commission through this turmoil. The law of 18 Germinal an III was enacted on April 7, 1795, formally establishing the metric system in France.

On July 12, 1794, a public decree reorganized the École des Mines (School of Mines) in Paris and specified the establishment of a Cabinet of Mineralogy, a collection of all Earth materials. In October 1794, René Just Haüy was appointed the first curator of the Cabinet of Mineralogy, later known as the Musée de Minéralogie. He may therefore be considered a founder of the Musée de Minéralogie.

On November 9, 1794, Haüy also became a professor of physics at the École normale supérieure. In 1802, Haüy became a professor of mineralogy at the Muséum national d'Histoire naturelle (National Museum of Natural History).

Haüy's work was appreciated by Napoleon, who made Haüy an Honorary Canon of the Eglise Métropolitain de Paris (Notre Dame) on April 5, 1802. On November 28, 1803, Haüy became one of the first recipients of the Order of the Légion d'Honneur. Napoleon encouraged Haüy to write Traité élémentaire de physique (1803), and is reported to have read it during his incarceration on Elba in 1814. During his brief return to power in 1815, Napoleon promoted Haüy to officer of the Légion d'Honneur.

After 1814 Haüy was deprived of his appointments by the Restoration government. He spent his final days in poverty, dying in Paris on June 1, 1822, even if "June 3" is systematically reported. The confusion in Haüy's death date (June 1 instead of June 3) is an 1823 error by Cuvier, rectified in 1944 by A. Lacroix but still often misreported.

== Recognition ==
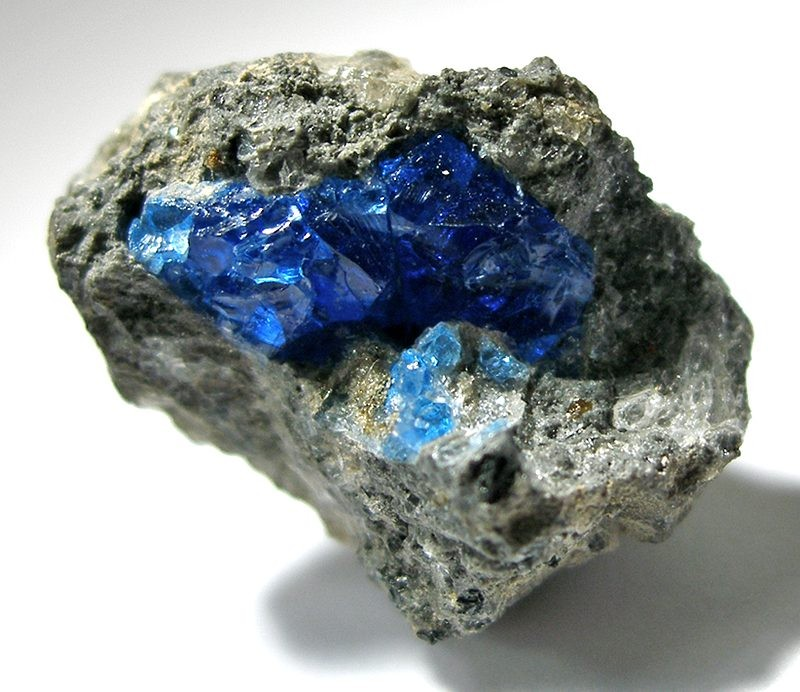
Haüyne crystals

In 1817, René-Just Haüy was elected an honorary member of the New York Academy of Sciences.

His name is the thirteenth inscribed on the south-east side of the Eiffel Tower.

The mineral Haüyne was named for Haüy in 1807 by Thomas-Christophe Bruun-Neergaard. It occurs in silica-deficient igneous rocks in a wide variety of locations.

== Works ==
The following are Haüy's principal works:

- Essai d'une théorie sur la structure des crystaux (1784) via Gallica
- Exposition raisonnée de la théorie de l'électricité et du magnétisme (in French). Paris: veuve Nicolas Desaint. 1787.
- De la structure considérée comme caractère distinctif des minéraux (1793)
- Exposition abrégé de la théorie de la structure des cristaux (1793) BNF
- Extrait d'un traité élémentaire de minéralogie (1797)
- Traité de minéralogie (5 vols, 1801) BNF: Vol 1 Vol 2 Vol 3 Vol 4 Vol 5
- Traité élémentaire de physique (2 vols 1803, 1806) Google Books
- Tableau comparatif des résultats de la cristallographie, et de l'analyse chimique relativement à la classification des minéraux (1809) BNF
- Traité des pierres précieuses (1817) BNF
- Traité de cristallographie (2 vols, 1822) Google Books

He also contributed papers, of which 100 are enumerated in the Royal Society's catalogue, to various scientific journals, especially the Journal de physique and the Annales du Museum d'Histoire Naturelle.

== See also ==
- Centered octahedral number
- List of Roman Catholic scientist-clerics
