= Geometrical crystallography before X-rays =

History of geometrical crystallography to 1895

Geometrical crystallography before X-rays describes how geometrical crystallography developed as a science up to the discovery of X-rays by Wilhelm Conrad Röntgen in 1895. In the period before X-rays, crystallography can be divided into three broad areas: geometric crystallography culminating in the discovery of the 230 space groups in 1891–1894, physical crystallography and chemical crystallography.

Geometrical crystallography before X-rays covers the study of crystal form and the mathematical representation of crystal structure. It includes the atomism and dynamism theories of crystal structure, the invention of the Miller indices, and the discovery of the 7 crystal systems, the 32 crystal classes, the 14 Bravais lattices, and the 230 space groups.

== 16th century ==
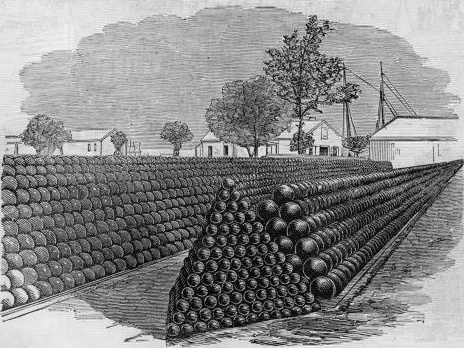
Cannonballs piled on a triangular (front) and rectangular (back) base, both face-centered cubic lattices.

The study of the geometrical properties of crystals began in the 16th century. In 1546 Georgius Agricola published a study of mineralogy in which morphology, or geometrical shape, was one of the characteristics used to classify minerals such as quartz. In 1550 Gerolamo Cardano made an early attempt to explain the shape of crystals as the result of a close packing of spheres. In 1591 Thomas Harriot studied the close packing of cannonballs (spheres). In 1597 Andreas Libavius recognized the geometrical characteristics of crystals and identified salts from their crystal shape.

== 17th century ==
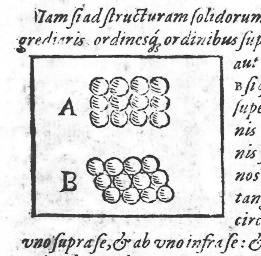
Drawing by Kepler (1611) of square (A) and hexagonal (B) packings

In 1611 Johannes Kepler published Strena Seu de Nive Sexangula (A New Year's Gift of Hexagonal Snow) which is considered the first treatise on geometrical and atomistic crystallography. Kepler studied the packing of spheres, in order to explain the hexagonal symmetry of snow crystals. Kepler demonstrated that in a compact packing each sphere has six neighbours in the same plane, three in the plane above, and three in the plane below, for a total of twelve touching spheres. Kepler concluded that π/(3√2) = 0.74084 is the maximum possible density amongst any arrangement of spheres — this became known as the Kepler conjecture. The conjecture was finally proved by Thomas Hales in 1998.

In 1665 Robert Hooke attempted to explain crystal morphology based on the stacking of atoms. In his work Micrographia he reported on the regularity of quartz crystals observed with the recently invented microscope, and proposed that they are formed by spherules.

Nicolas Steno rejected Paracelsus's proposed organic origin for crystals. Steno first observed the law of constancy of interfacial angles when studying quartz crystals (De solido intra solidum naturaliter contento, Florence, 1669), and noted that, although the crystals of a substance differed in appearance from one to another, the angles between corresponding faces were always the same. Steno's work can be considered as the beginning of crystallography as an independent discipline.

Cleavage planes in a crystal of Iceland spar (Huygens, 1690)

In 1678 Christiaan Huygens proposed a structural explanation of the double refraction of calcite based on ellipsoidal atoms. Huygens discovered the polarization of light by Iceland spar, a transparent form of calcite, and published his results in his Traité de la Lumière.

A geometrical theory of crystal structure based on polyhedra was proposed by Domenico Guglielmini. Guglielmini's publications of 1688 (Riflessioni filosofiche dedotte dalle figure de Sali) and 1705 (De salibus dissertatio epistolaris physico-medico-mechanica) concluded that basic forms (cube, rhombohedron, hexagonal prism, and octahedron) of various salt crystals are characteristic of each substance, are identical in form, indivisible, and have faces with identical inclinations to each other.

== 18th century ==
In 1723 Moritz Anton Cappeller published Prodromus Crystallographiae, the first treatise on crystal shapes. The introduction of the term crystallography is attributed to Cappeller. In 1758 Roger Joseph Boscovich published his atomic theory which stated that particles of matter were linked by attractive and repulsive forces and that the solid so formed was compressible rather than rigid; this would become relevant in the 19th century when Haüy theorised that crystals were constructed from identical units stacked up without spaces.

Carl Linnaeus promoted a morphological, as opposed to a physical or chemical, approach to the study of crystals. Linneaus published many accurate and detailed drawings of crystals, and identified the forms which were related by truncation.

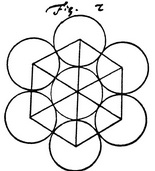
Hexagonal arrangement of spheres modelling the structure of niter (Lomonosov, 1749).

In 1749 Mikhail Lomonosov postulated spherical atoms to study the structure of niter and rediscovered cubic close packing. However, his work was not influential at the time.

In 1773 Torbern Bergman, a leader in the field of chemical analysis, described the crystal forms of calcite and stated that all the forms could be built up from the cleavage rhombohedron. Bergman, building on the previous work of Linnaeus, developed a classification of minerals based on chemical characteristics, with subclasses organized by their external shapes, and defined seven primary crystal forms. In 1774 Abraham Gottlob Werner published his classification of minerals. Werner's postulated seven primary forms, and showed that some geometrical forms could be derived from one another by truncation.

With Jean-Baptiste L. Romé de l'Isle's Essai de cristallographie published in 1772 and Cristallographie published in 1783 the scientific approach to crystal structure began. Romé de l'Isle described over 500 crystal forms and accurately measured the interfacial angles of a great variety of crystals, using the goniometer designed by his student Arnould Carangeot. Romé de l'Isle noted that the angles are characteristic of a substance, thus generalizing the law of constancy of angles postulated by Steno. Romé de l'Isle considered that the shape of a crystal is a consequence of the packing of elemental particles, and defined six primitive forms. However, Romé de l'Isle criticized René Just Haüy and Torbern Bergman for speculation on the internal structure of crystals without sufficient observational data.

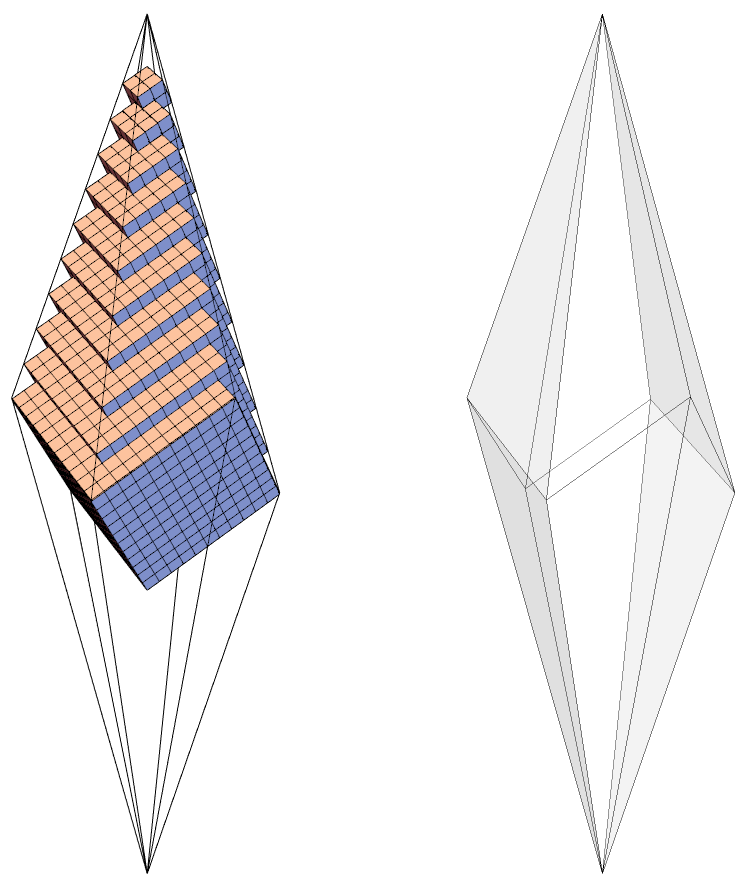
Calcite scalenohedron crystal constructed from small building blocks (molécules intégrantes) using the law of decrements of René Just Haüy.

In 1781 René Just Haüy (often termed the "Father of crystallography") discovered that crystals always cleave along crystallographic planes. Based on this observation, and the fact that the inter-facial angles in each crystal species always have the same value, Haüy concluded that crystals must be periodic and composed of regularly arranged layers of tiny polyhedra (molécules intégrantes). This theory explained why all crystal planes are related by small rational numbers (the law of rational indices). In 1784 René-Just Haüy published Essai d'une théorie sur la structure des cristaux, appliquée à plusieurs genres de substances cristallisées in which he stated his law of decrements (décroissement): a crystal is composed of molecules arranged periodically in three dimensions without leaving any gaps. Haüy's molecular crystal structure theory assumed that molécules intégrantes were specific in shape and composition for every compound. Haüy developed his mathematical theory of crystal structure over many years. Haüy's theory turned out to be remarkably accurate, and gave crystallography a legitimate place among the sciences.

Haüy's crystal structure theory was criticised as over-simplistic by William Hyde Wollaston in 1813 and by Henry James Brooke in 1819. Haüy also tended to ignore experimental results that contradicted his structural theory, such as those achieved with the more accurate reflection goniometer invented by Wollaston in 1809. In 1819 Eilhard Mitscherlich discovered the law of isomorphism which states that compounds which contain the same number of atoms, and have similar structures, tend to exhibit similar crystal forms. The discovery of the phenomena of isomorphism and polymorphism dealt a clear blow to Haüy's crystal structure theory.

== Atomism versus Dynamism ==
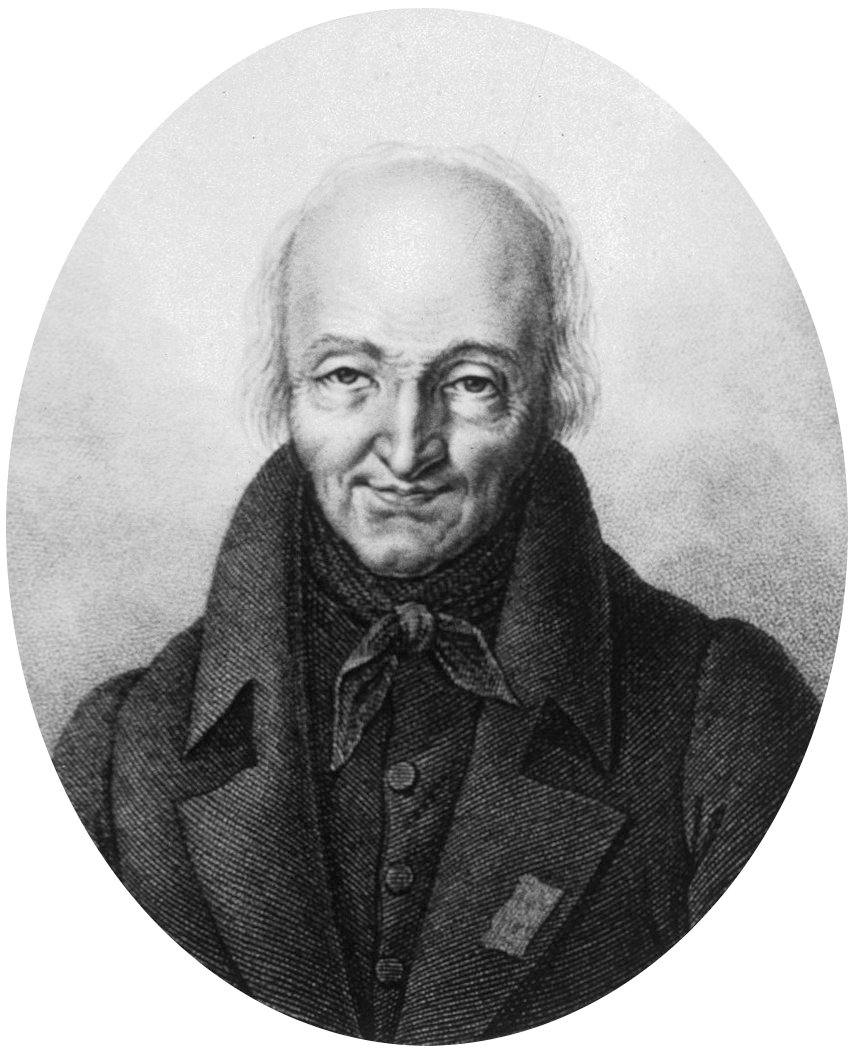
René Just Haüy

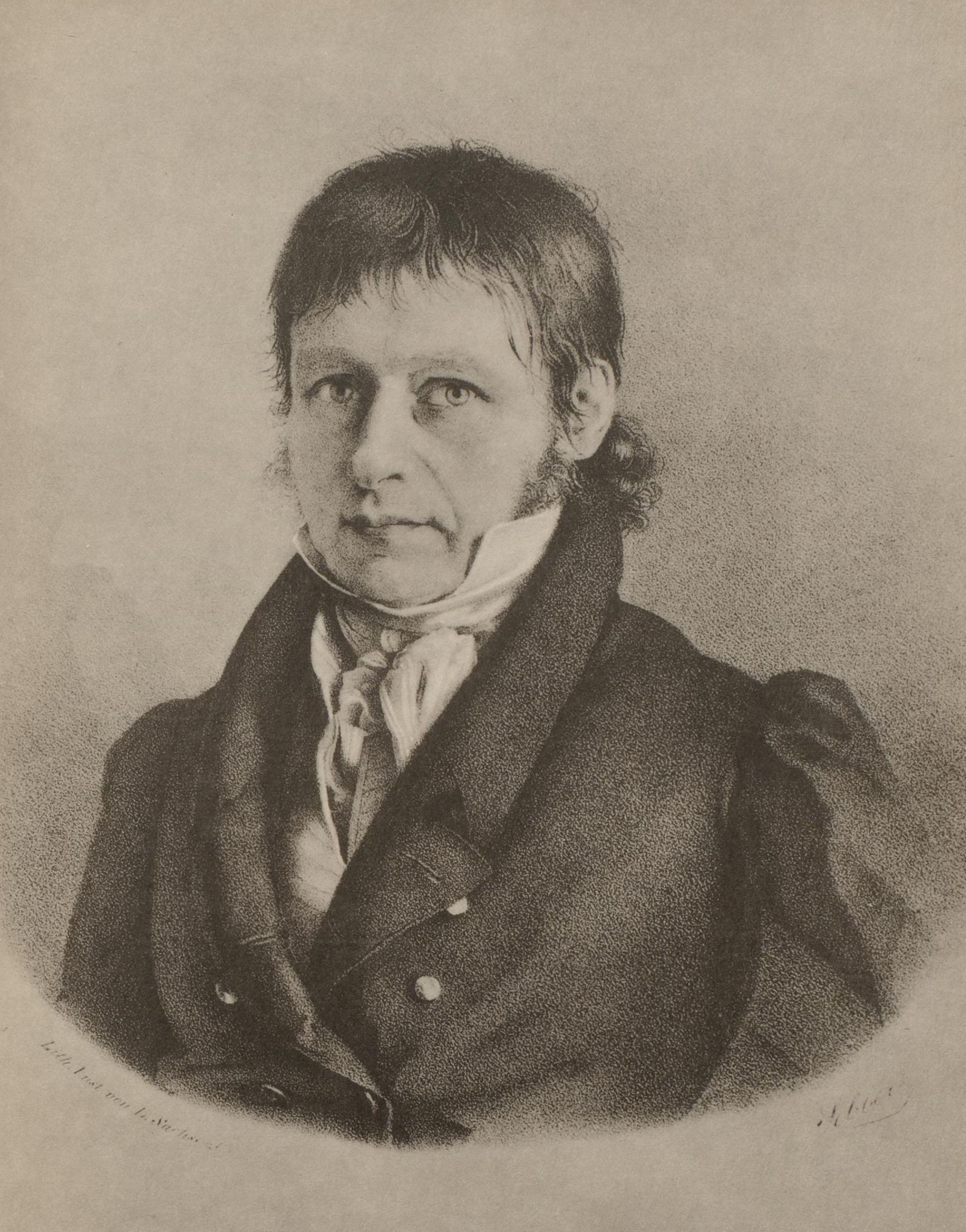
Christian Samuel Weiss

Leaders of the Atomistic (French) and Dynamic (German) Schools of Crystallography

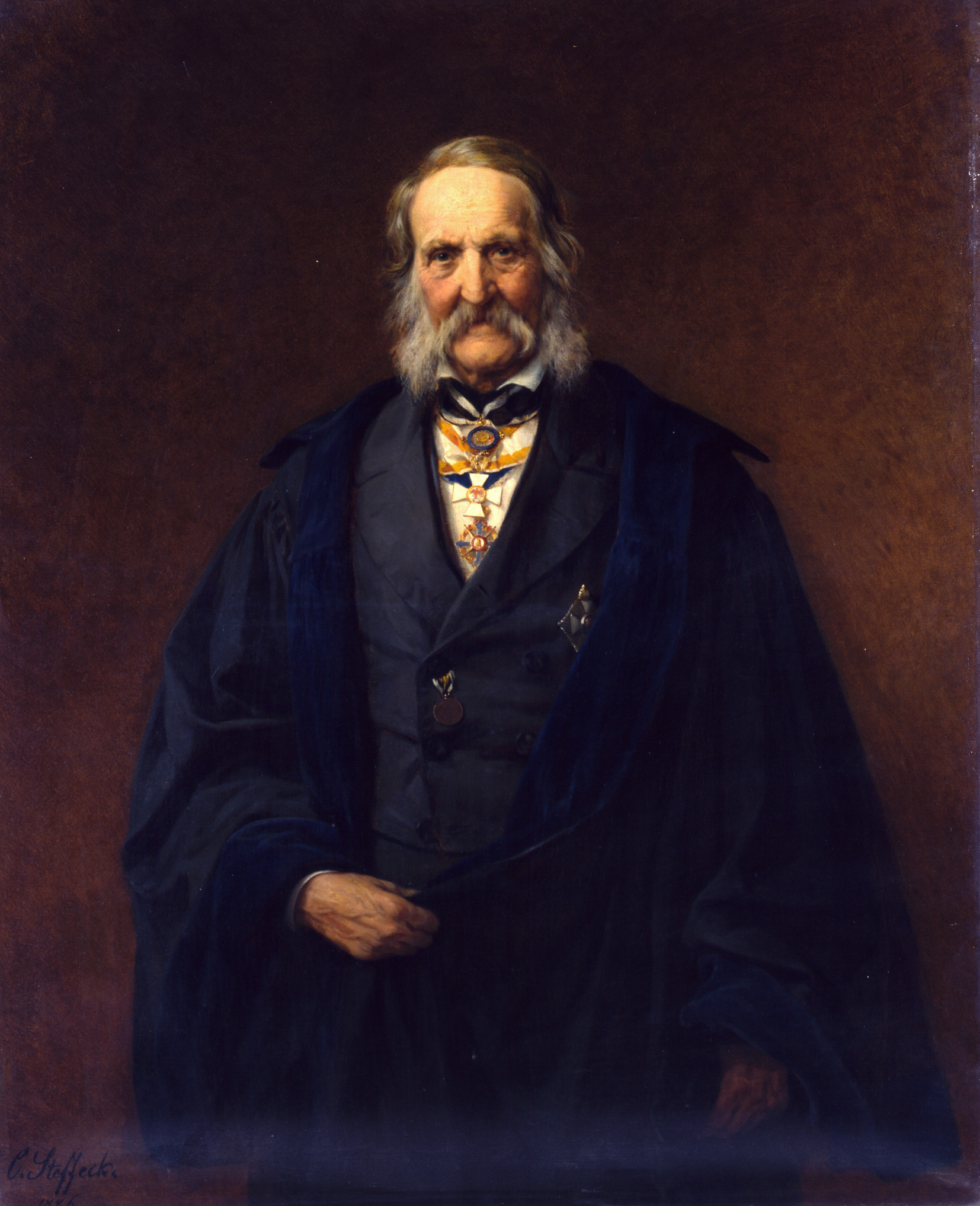
Franz Ernst Neumann

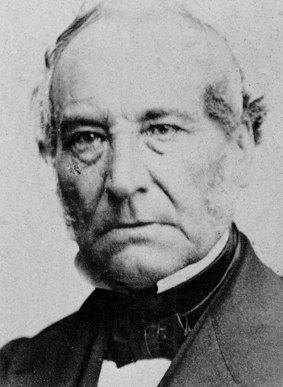
Gabriel Delafosse

Researchers in the development of geometrical crystallography

Christian Samuel Weiss became familiar with Haüy's theory by translating the 4-volume Traité de mineralogie (1801). Weiss added an appendix to volume 1 of the translation in which he first outlined his dynamical theory of crystals. In contrast to Haüy, Weiss took a purely geometric approach to external crystal morphology, completely disregarding any attempt at modelling the internal structure of crystals. Weiss has been termed "the founder of geometric crystallography".

Weiss rejected Haüy's static "atomistic" theory of crystals instead using a "dynamic" approach that was typical of the German natural philosophers of the early 19th century. Weiss understood the external forms of crystals as a consequence of internal attractions and repulsions, and that generative forces were expressed in definite directions which could be observed as one or more axes of rotation. Weiss used crystallographic axes as the basis of his systematic classification of crystals.

Weiss and his followers Moritz Ludwig Frankenheim and Johann F. C. Hessel studied the symmetry of crystals. Up until 1800 the concept of symmetry had a variety of meanings, however during the 19th century crystallography was progressively transformed into an empirical and mathematical science by the adoption of symmetry concepts. "In the first half of the 19th century the paramount symmetry problem was that of point symmetry: to enumerate all possible combinations of symmetry elements which pass through a common point, the origin, and therefore leave this point single. The crystallographic symmetry elements were observed to be exclusively 2, 3, 4 and 6-fold axes, mirror planes, and centres of inversion."

In 1829 Justus Günther Graßmann published a study of the symmetries of the crystal systems using an algebra of linear combinations. In 1832 Franz Ernst Neumann used symmetry considerations when studying double refraction in crystals. By the second half of the 19th century the study of crystals was focused more on their geometry and mathematical analysis than their physical properties.

Gabriel Delafosse continued Haüy's work in France. He was the first to use the terms lattice (réseau) and unit cell (maille). He stated that the orientation of the axes in a substance is constant, which implies symmetry of translation (a defining feature of a lattice), and that the external symmetry of a crystal reflects its inner symmetry, namely the symmetry of the constituent atoms and their arrangement. In other words, the law of symmetry applies to both the inside and the outside of a crystal.

French scientists did not adopt the dynamic crystallographic theory, but they did attempt to learn from it. Delafosse built on Haüy's crystallographic approach by stating that the structure and physical properties of crystals should exhibit the same symmetry. Delafosse aimed to resolve the apparent counter-examples to Haüy's law of symmetry by explaining that the symmetry of the physical phenomena revealed the inner structure of crystals. This structure is sometimes more complex than the external morphology. Crystals, in these cases, are of lower symmetry than the lattice. This substructure explained the behaviour of hemihedral crystals, which were not adequately accounted for by Haüy. Delafosse argued that Haüy's molécules intégrante did not necessarily have a physical reality, but rather that its polyhedral form should be regarded instead as the space surrounding a lattice point.

== Crystal systems ==
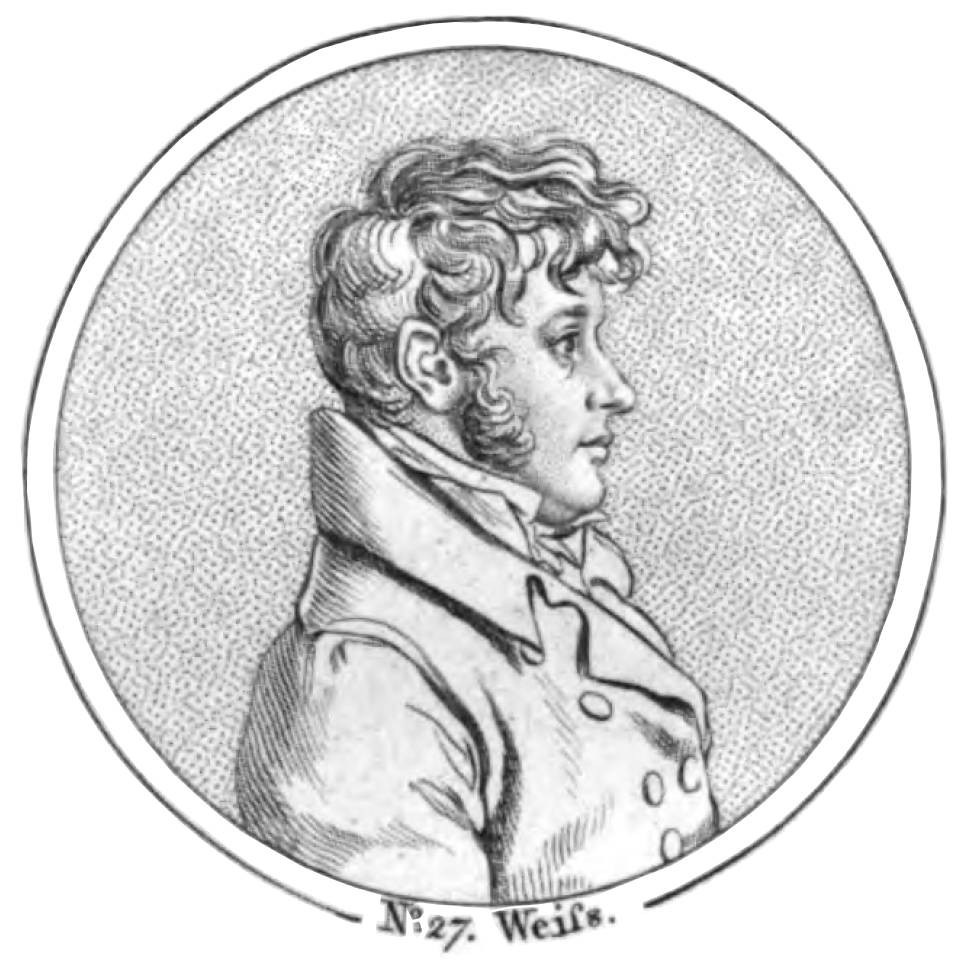
Christian Samuel Weiss

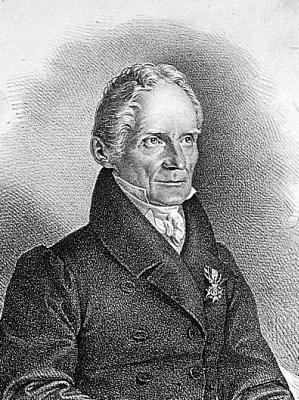
Friedrich Mohs

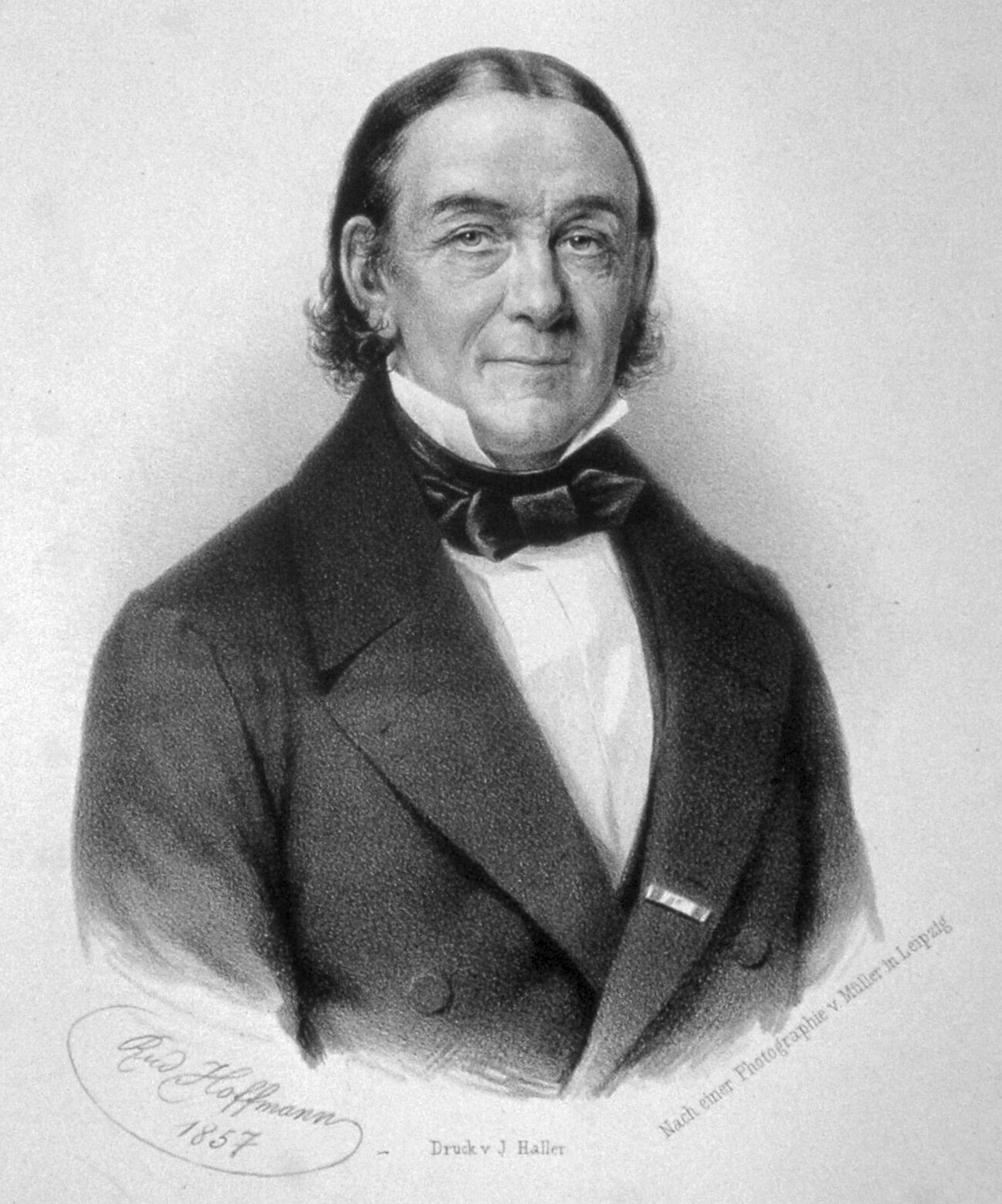
Carl F. Naumann

Discoverers of the 7 crystal systems (1815–1830)

Christian Samuel Weiss introduced the concept of crystal systems in 1815. Weiss defined seven crystal systems: five based on three orthogonal axes (cubic, tetragonal, orthorhombic, monoclinic and triclinic), and two (trigonal and hexagonal) based on three axes in a plane at 60° to each other and a fourth axis orthogonal to the plane. The number and type of the crystal systems of Weiss correspond to the modern systems apart from the triclinic and monoclinic cases which have non-orthogonal axes.

Friedrich Mohs established a classification system for minerals based solely on their external shape. Mohs distinguished four crystal systems rather than the seven identified by Weiss. In 1822 Weiss and Mohs engaged in a priority dispute on who had first discovered the crystal systems.

Crystal systems according to Mohs and Weiss
Mohs system	Weiss system	Modern system	Required symmetries of the point group
Rhombohedral	I. Three- and three-fold	Trigonal	1 x 3-fold axis of rotation
	II. Six-fold	Hexagonal	1 x 6-fold axis of rotation
Pyramidal	III. Four-fold	Tetragonal	1 x 4-fold axis of rotation
Prismatic	IV. Two- and two-fold	Orthorhombic	3 x 2-fold axis of rotation or 1 x 2-fold plus 2 mirror planes
	V. Two- and one-fold	Monoclinic	1 x 2-fold axis of rotation or 1 mirror plane
	VI. One- and one-fold	Triclinic	None
Tessular	VII. Isotropic or spheroidal	Cubic	4 x 3-fold axis of rotation

In 1824 Carl Friedrich Naumann confirmed Mohs' observation that the triclinic and monoclinic systems required inclined rather than orthogonal axes. Naumann attempted a synthesis of the Weiss and Mohs systems by considering four different configuration of axes: orthogonal (three right angles), monoclinic (two right angles and one oblique one), diclinic (one right angle and two oblique ones), and triclinic (three oblique ones). The diclinic system has not survived.

== Crystal classes ==
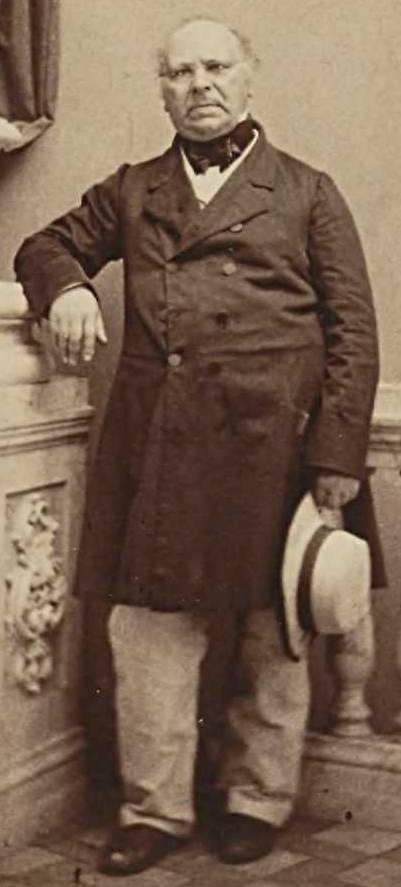
Moritz Ludwig Frankenheim

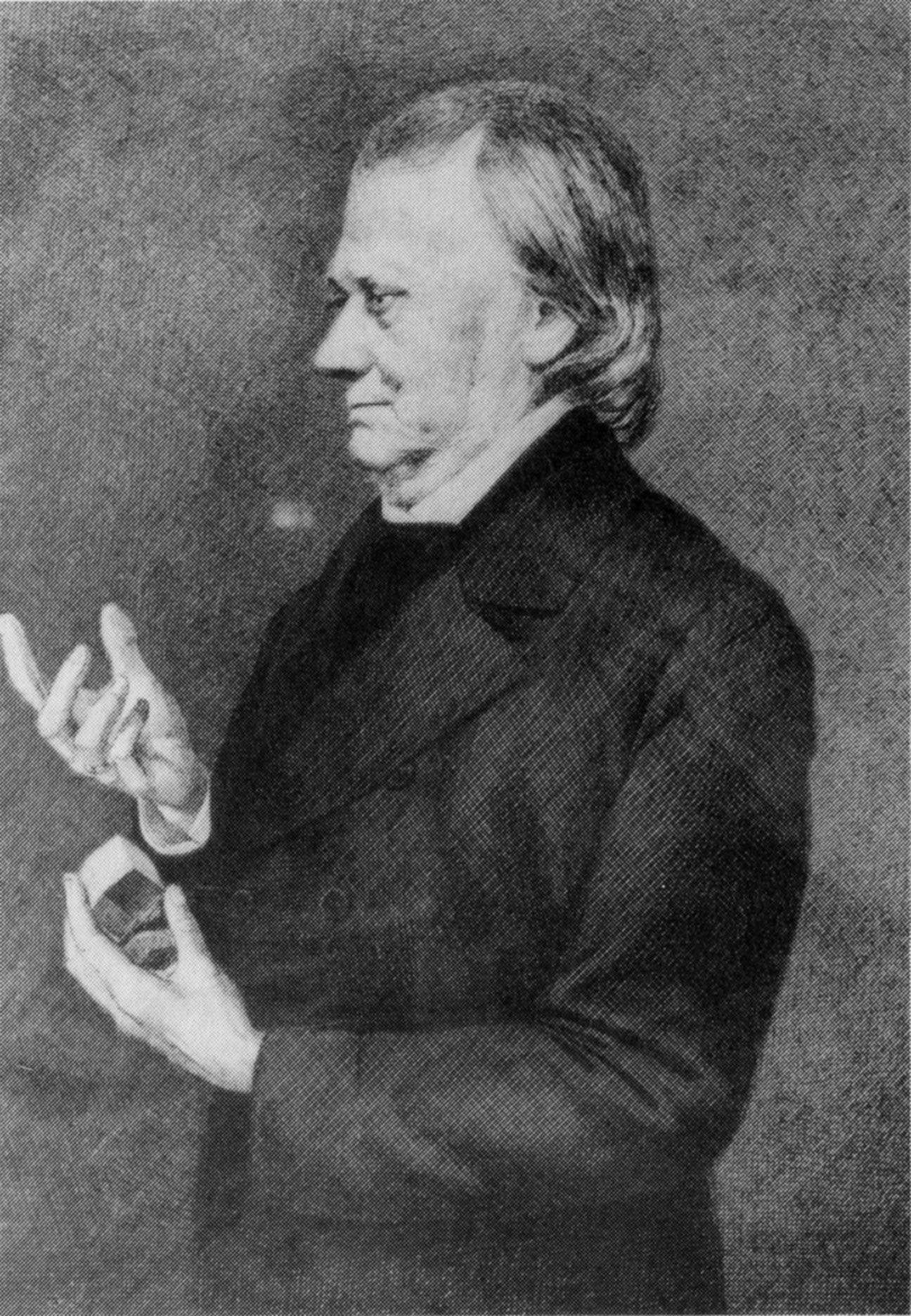
Johann F. C. Hessel

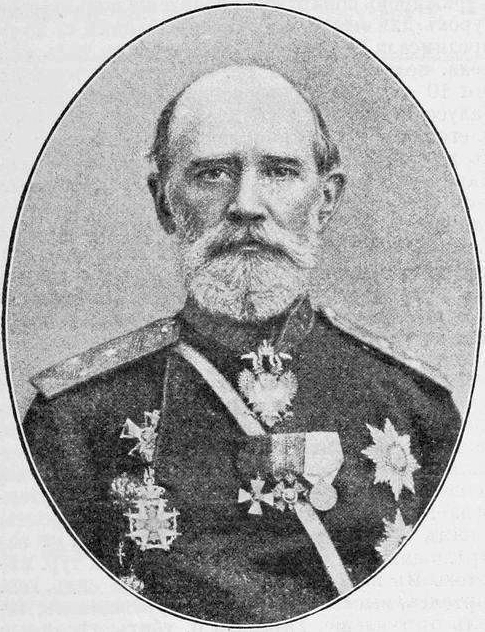
Axel Gadolin

Discoverers of the 32 crystal classes (point groups) (1826–69)

In 1826 Moritz Ludwig Frankenheim published the first derivation of the 32 crystal classes, but his work was forgotten for many decades. In 1830, Johann Hessel proved that, as a consequence of the law of rational indices, morphological forms can combine to give exactly 32 kinds of crystal symmetry in Euclidean space, since only two-, three-, four-, and six-fold rotation axes can occur (the crystallographic restriction). However, Hessel's work remained practically unknown for over 60 years and, in 1867, Axel Gadolin independently rediscovered his results. Gadolin, who was unaware of the work of his predecessors, found the crystal classes using stereographic projection to represent the symmetry elements of the 32 groups. Gadolin's work had a clarity that attracted widespread attention, and caused Hessel's earlier work to be neglected.

In 1884 Bernhard Minnigerode recognized the relationship with crystallography, and analyzed the 32 possible crystal classes in terms of group theory. It was not recognized until later that it is precisely the mathematical group properties that make symmetry significant for crystals.

== Miller indices ==
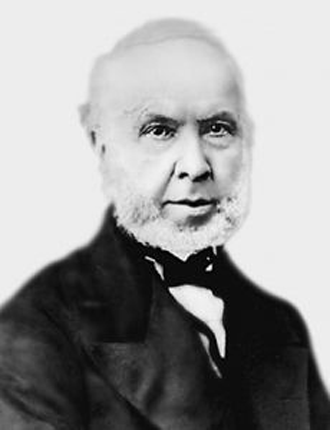
William H. Miller

Miller indices

William H. Miller inventor of the Miller indices (1839)

The first to introduce indices to denote crystal planes was Christian Samuel Weiss. In the Weiss system a face is denoted by its three intercepts, ma, nb, pc, with three orthogonal axes, where a, b and c are unit lengths along these axes (in modern notation (1/m 1/n 1/p)). In 1823 Franz Ernst Neumann suggested that the inverse of the Weiss indices (m n p) were simpler and easier to use. In 1825 William Whewell, independently from Neumann, proposed essentially the same indices although he used the letters p, q and r.

William Hallowes Miller, a student of Whewell and subsequently his successor in the Chair of Mineralogy at Cambridge University, introduced the Miller indices in his book A Treatise on Crystallography (1839). The Miller indices are essentially the same as those of Neumann and Whewell but Miller used the letters h, k and l (h k l). Miller's indices were accepted by his contemporaries because of their algebraic convenience, and it is his notation that is currently used in crystallography.

== Bravais lattices ==
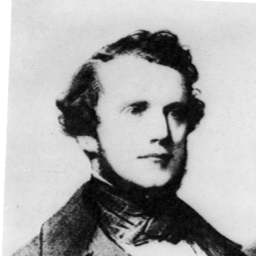
Auguste Bravais

Bravais lattices

Auguste Bravais and the 14 Bravais lattices (1848)

In 1835 Moritz Ludwig Frankenheim introduced the notion of lattice, independently of Ludwig August Seeber, and derived 15 lattice types; these correspond to the 14 Bravais lattices, but Frankenheim double-counted one of the monoclinic lattices.

In 1848 Auguste Bravais presented his work in deriving the 14 Bravais lattices. The work was published in 1850, and translated into English in 1949. Bravais's work can be considered as drawing on a combination of the approaches of Haüy and Weiss. Bravais constructed his mathematical lattices as finite sets of points in space, thus avoiding the need for the packing of spheres or polyhedra to represent physical atoms or molecules. He defined axes, planes and centres of inversion as symmetry elements, and identified all of their possible combinations. Bravais assumed that every atom or molecule in the lattice had the same orientation; in 1879 Leonhard Sohncke removed this restriction to derive his "Sohncke groups". Camille Jordan acknowledged Bravais' work on the combination of symmetry elements in his group theory paper Mémoire sur les groupes des mouvements published in 1868–9.

In 1851 Bravais showed that crystals preferentially cleaved parallel to lattice planes of high density. This is sometimes referred to as Bravais's law or the law of reticular density and is an equivalent statement to the law of rational indices.

== Space groups ==
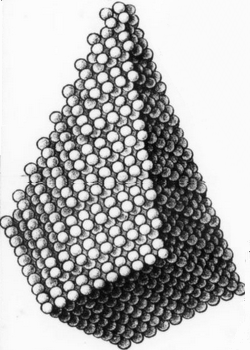
Scalenohedron by Ludwig Seeber

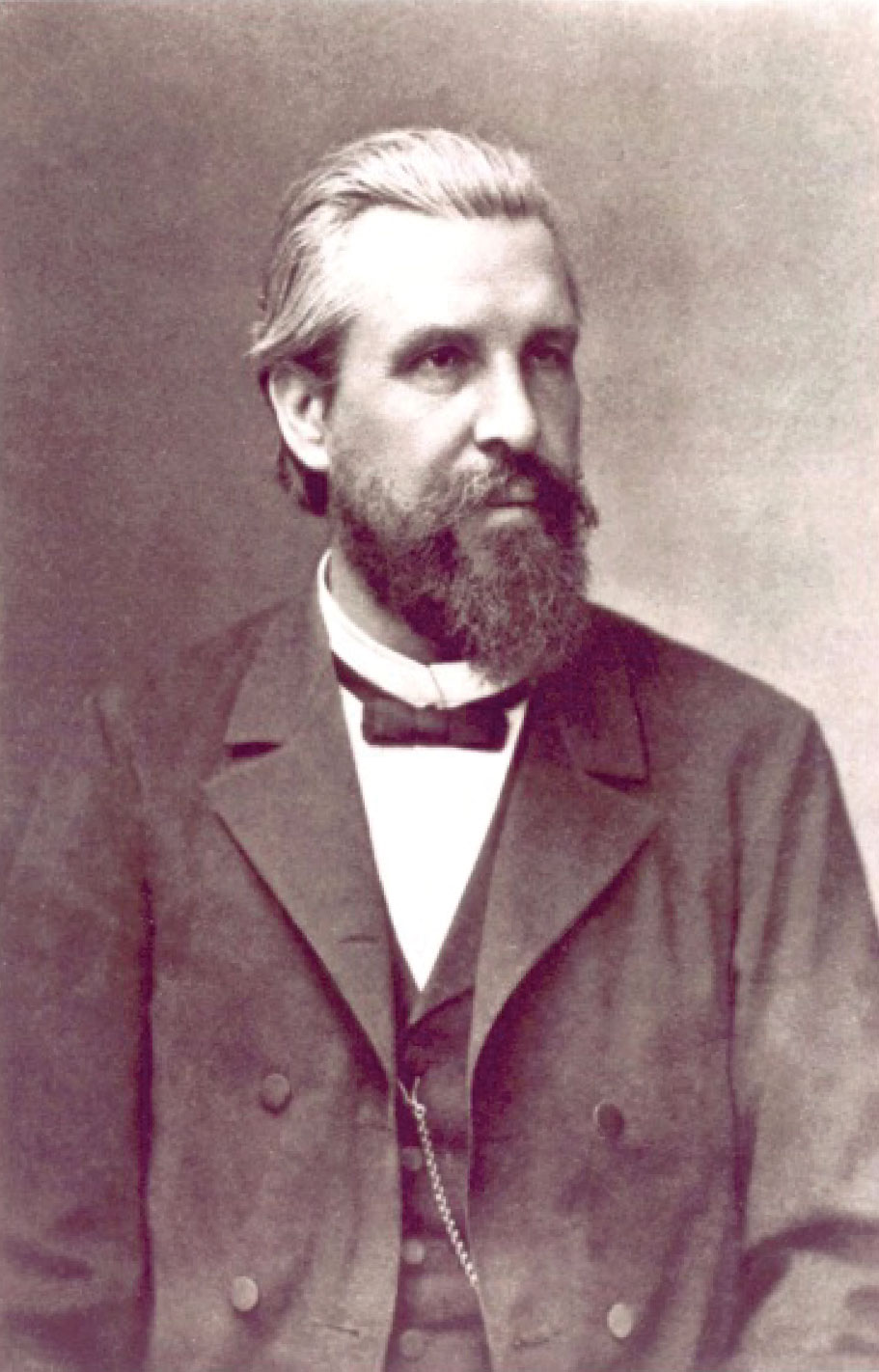
Leonhard Sohncke

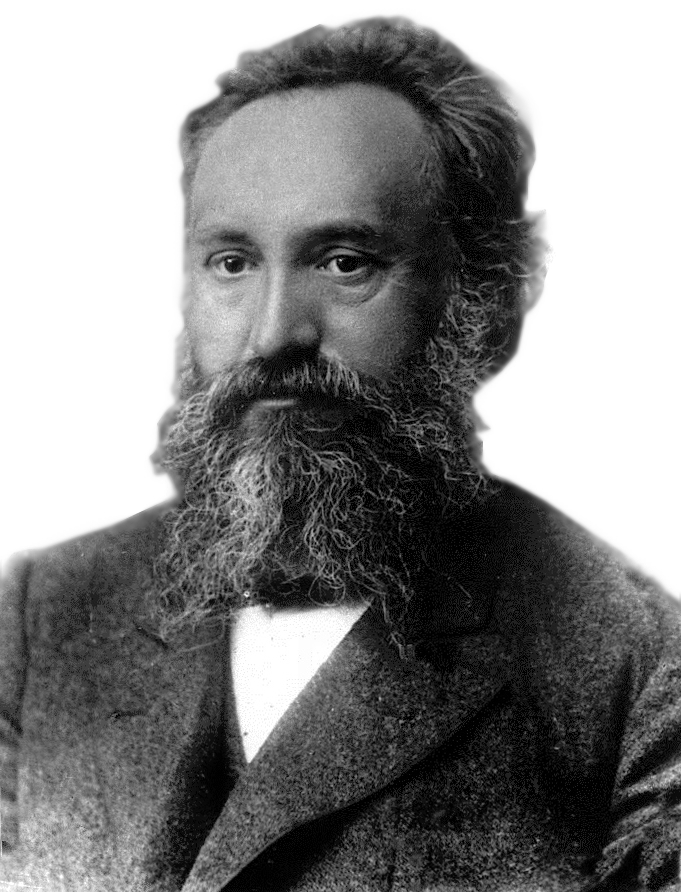
Evgraf Fedorov

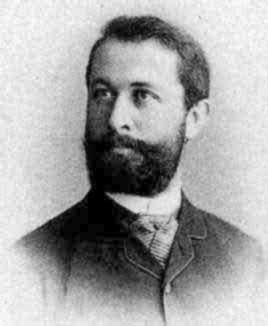
Arthur Moritz Schoenflies

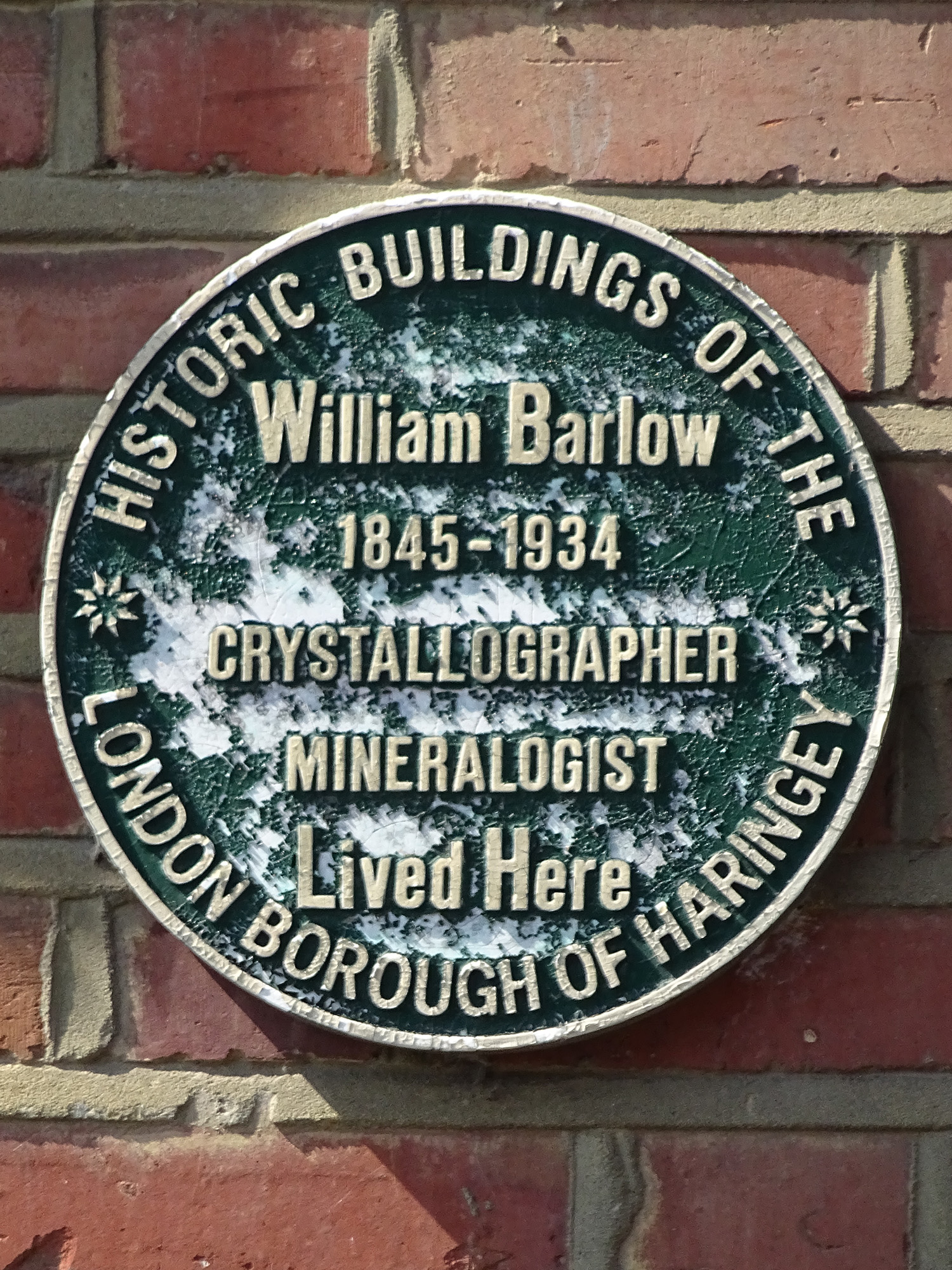
William Barlow plaque

Discoverers of the 230 space groups (1891–1894)

The identification of the 230 space groups has been extensively documented and is now regarded as a major achievement of 19th century science. The space groups became important in the 20th century after the discovery of X-ray diffraction and the founding of the field of X-ray crystallography.

Ludwig August Seeber first put forward the concept of the space lattice in 1824. He proposed that crystals were assembled from minute particles represented by spheres rather than stacked parallelepipeds without any gaps as Haüy had theorised (compare the scalenohedron diagrams of Haüy and Seeber). Seeber attempted to reconcile the atomistic and dynamic approaches by the regular arrangement of particles with attractive and repulsive forces between them; the gaps between the particles allow for expansion or contraction in response to external physical forces.

In 1879 Leonhard Sohncke combined the 14 Bravais lattices with the rotation axes and the screw axes to arrive at his 65 spatial arrangements of points in which chiral crystal structures form. Sohncke enumerated the space groups containing only the translations and rotations. Sohncke credited previous researchers, especially Auguste Bravais and Camille Jordan. He also rediscovered Seeber's 1824 paper on space lattices, and arranged an 1891 republication of Johann F. C. Hessel's 1830 work on the 32 crystal classes which had been previously overlooked.

Rotoinversions and glide reflections were introduced by Evgraf Fedorov and Arthur Moritz Schoenflies to derive the 230 space groups. Fedorov and Schoenflies used different methods, but collaborated to reach the final list of space groups in 1891. William Barlow also derived the 230 space groups in 1894 using a method based on patterns of oriented motifs.

Schoenflies work was more influential than Fedorov's because he published his work in German rather than Russian, and Schoenflies' notation was more convenient and became widely adopted. An English synthesis of the work of Fedorov, Schoenflies and Barlow was made available by Harold Hilton in 1903. Fedorov went on to derive the 17 plane groups in 1891 and to study space-filling polyhedra.

The discovery of the space groups was not universally recognized as an important scientific breakthrough at the time, but after the invention of X-ray crystallography their physical significance was fully appreciated.

Progress towards the 230 space groups
Name	Year	Discovery
Christian Samuel Weiss	1815	7 crystal systems (using 2-, 3-, 4- and 6-fold rotation axes)
Ludwig August Seeber	1824	Concept of the space lattice
Moritz Ludwig Frankenheim	1835	15 lattice types (however one was double-counted)
Auguste Bravais	1848	14 space lattices (Bravais lattices) and 7 crystal systems
Leonhard Sohncke	1879	65 spatial arrangement of points (by adding rotation axes and screw axes to the 14 space lattices)
Evgraf Fedorov	1891	230 space groups (by adding rotoinversions and glide reflections)
Arthur Moritz Schoenflies	1891	230 space groups (using group theory)
William Barlow	1894	230 space groups (using patterns of oriented motifs)

By the beginning of the 20th century Paul Groth defined the geometric structure of a crystal as follows: "A crystal—considered as indefinitely extended—consists of n interpenetrating regular-point systems; each of which is formed from similar atoms; each of these point systems is built up from a number of interpenetrating space lattices, each of the latter being formed from similar atoms occupying parallel positions."

== Crystal structure prediction ==
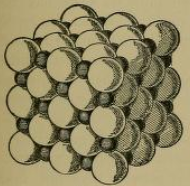
Sphere packing by William Barlow, 1897 representing the structure of rock-salt (NaCl)

Until the use of X-rays there was no way to determine the actual crystal structure of even the simplest substances such as salt (NaCl). For example, in the 1880s, William Barlow proposed several crystal structures based on close-packing of spheres some of which were validated later by X-ray crystallography; however the available data were too scarce in the 1880s to accept his models as conclusive.

In the period between the discovery of X-rays (1895) and X-ray diffraction (1912) Barlow and William Jackson Pope developed the principles of packing, and showed how to deduce the structures of some simple compounds. William Johnson Sollas emphasised the importance of different atomic sizes in constructing simple crystals, and correctly concluded that the sodium and chlorine atoms in salt would be of different sizes.

== Research community ==
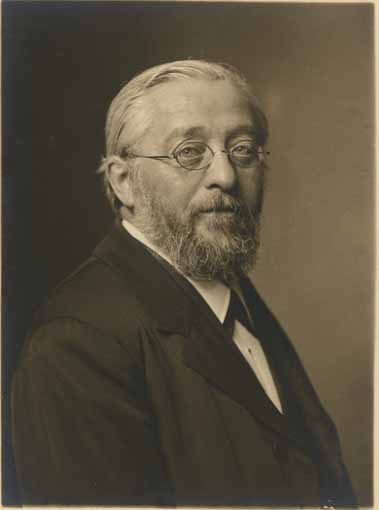
Paul Groth

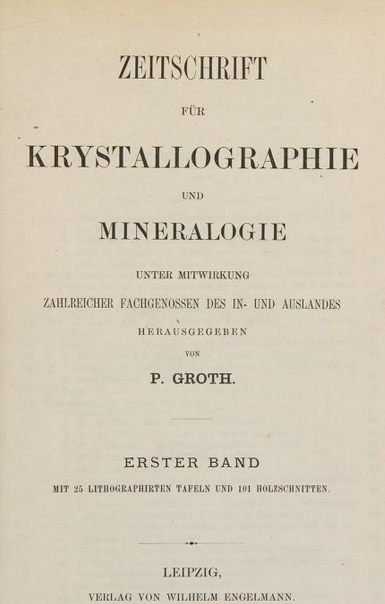
Z. Kryst., 1, 1877

Founder of Zeitschrift für Krystallographie

Before the 20th century crystallography was not a well-established academic discipline. There were no academic positions specifically in crystallography. Workers in the field normally carried out their crystallographic research as an ancillary to other employment(s), or had independent means. The leading workers in the field of geometrical crystallography were employed as follows:

- Professors
  - Mathematics or science: Bergman, Bravais, Fedorov, Frankenheim, Guglielmini, Kepler, Schoenflies, Seeber, Sohncke,
  - Mineralogy: Delafosse, Groth, Haüy, Hessel, Miller, Mohs, Naumann, Neumann, Weiss, Whewell
- Physicians: Cappeller, Hessel, Steno, Wollaston
- Clerics: Haüy, Steno
- Officials:
  - Military officers: Bravais, Gadolin,
  - Municipal officials: Hooke,
- Other employment: Carangeot (business manager), Romé de l'Isle (cataloguer), Sohncke (meteorological service)
- Independently wealthy: Barlow, Huygens

In the nineteenth century there were informal schools of geometrical crystallography researchers in France (Haüy, Delafosse, Bravais), Germany (Weiss, Mohs, Frankenheim, Hessel, Seeber, Naumann, Neumann, Sohncke, Groth, Schoenflies) and England (Wollaston, Whewell, Miller, Barlow).

Until the founding of Zeitschrift für Krystallographie und Mineralogie by Paul Groth in 1877 there was no lead journal for the publication of crystallographic papers. The majority of crystallographic research was published in the journals of national scientific societies, or in mineralogical journals. The inauguration of Groth's journal marked the emergence of crystallography as a mature science independent of geology.

== See also ==
- History of crystallography before X-rays
  - Chemical crystallography before X-rays
  - Physical crystallography before X-rays
- Timeline of crystallography

== Works cited ==
- Adams, Frank D. (1918). "Haüy, The "father of crystallography"". The American Mineralogist. 3: 131–132.
- Agricola, Georgius (1546). De Natura Fossilium [The Nature of Fossils] (in Latin). Basileae. Archived from the original on 19 July 2017.
- Agricola, Georgius (1955) [1546]. De Natura Fossilium (Textbook of Mineralogy). Translated by Bundy, Mark Chance; Bundy, Jean A. New York: Geological Society of America.
- Alworth, William L. (1972). "Historical development of the concept of biological stereospecificity". Stereochemistry and its application in biochemistry: the relation between substrate symmetry and biological stereospecificity. New York: Wiley-Interscience. pp. 1–14. ISBN 0-471-02518-6.
- Authier, A. (2013). Early days of x-ray crystallography. International Union of Crystallography Texts on Crystallography. Oxford: Oxford University Press. doi:10.1093/acprof:oso/9780199659845.001.0001. ISBN 9780198754053.
- Barlow, William M. (1883a). "Probable nature of the internal symmetry of crystals". Nature. 29 (738): 186–188. Bibcode:1883Natur..29..186B. doi:10.1038/029186a0.
- Barlow, William M. (1883b). "Probable nature of the internal symmetry of crystals". Nature. 29 (738): 205–207. Bibcode:1883Natur..29..205B. doi:10.1038/029205a0.
- Barlow, William M. (1884). "Probable nature of the internal symmetry of crystals". Nature. 29 (748): 404. Bibcode:1884Natur..29..404B. doi:10.1038/029404b0. S2CID 4016086.
- Barlow, William (1 December 1894). "I. Ueber die geometrischen Eigenschaften homogener starrer Structuren und ihre Anwendung auf Krystalle" [On the geometrical properties of homogeneous rigid structures and their application to crystals]. Zeitschrift für Kristallographie (in German). 23 (1–6): 1–63. doi:10.1524/zkri.1894.23.1.1.
- Barlow, William (1897). "A Mechanical Cause of Homogeneity of structures and symmetry geometrically investigated: with special application to crystals and to chemical combination". Scientific Proceedings of the Royal Dublin Society. 8: 527–689.
- Barlow, W.; Miers, H. A. (1901). "The Structure of Crystals". Report of The Seventy-First Meeting of the British Association for the Advancement of Science. London: John Murray. pp. 297–337.
- Barlow, William; Pope, William Jackson (1906). "A development of the atomic theory which correlates chemical and crystalline structure and leads to a demonstration of the nature of valency". J. Chem. Soc., Trans. 89: 1675–1744. doi:10.1039/ct9068901675.
- Barlow, William; Pope, William Jackson (1907). "The relation between the crystalline form and the chemical constitution of simple inorganic substances". J. Chem. Soc., Trans. 91: 1150–1214. doi:10.1039/ct9079101150.
- Barlow, William; Pope, William Jackson (1910). "The relation between the crystal structure and the chemical composition, constitution, and configuration of organic substances". J. Chem. Soc., Trans. 97: 2308–2388. doi:10.1039/ct9109702308.
- Bergman, Torbern O. (1773). "Variae crystallorum formae a spatho orthae" [Various forms of crystals from orthogonal spar]. Nova Acta Regiae Societatis Scientiarum Upsaliensis (in Latin). 1: 150–155.
- Bergman, T. O. (1780). "De formis crystallorum, praesertim e spatho ortis". Opuscula Physica et Chemica (in Latin). Vol. 2. Uppsala: Johan Edman. pp. 1–25. Archived from the original on 29 December 2009.
- Birembaut, Arthur (1971). "Carangeot, Arnould". In Gillispie, Charles Coulston (ed.). Dictionary of scientific biography. Vol. 3. New York: Charles Scribner's Sons. pp. 61–62. ISBN 0684169649. Archived from the original on 23 February 2024.
- Bonpunt, Louis (1999). "The emergence of symmetry concepts by the way of the study of crystals (1600–1900)" (PDF). Symmetry: Culture and Science. 10 (1–2): 127–141.
- Boscovich, Roger Joseph (1922) [1763]. A Theory of Natural Philosophy. Translated by Child, J. M. Chicago; London: Open Court.
- Boulliard, Jean-Claude; Cabaret, Delphine; Giura, Paolo (2022). "René-Just Haüy and the birth of crystallography". IUCr Newsletter. 30 (4). IUCr.
- Bravais, Auguste (1850). "Mémoire sur les systèmes formés par des points distribués regulièrement sur un plan ou dans l'espace" [On the Systems Formed by Points Regularly Distributed on a Plane or in Space]. Journal de l'École Polytechnique (in French). 19: 1–128. Archived from the original on 25 November 2008.
- Bravais, Auguste (1851). "Études Cristallographiques" [Crystallographic studies]. Journal de l'École polytechnique (in French): 101–276.
- Bravais, Auguste (1866). Études Cristallographiques [Crystallographic studies] (in French). Paris: Gauthier-Villars. p. 168.
- Bravais, Auguste (1949). On the Systems Formed by Points Regularly Distributed on a Plane or in Space. Translated by Shaler, Amos J. The Crystallographic Society of America.
- Brock, Henry M. (1913). "Haüy, René-Just". In Herbermann, Charles G.; Pace, Edward A.; Pallen, Condé B.; Shahan, Thomas J.; Wynne, John J. (eds.). The Catholic Encyclopedia, Knights Of Columbus Special Edition. Vol. 7. New York: The Encyclopedia Press, Inc. p. 152.
- Brooke, H. J. (1819). "Observations on a Memoir by the Abbé Haüy on the Measurement of the Angles of Crystals". Annals of Philosophy. 14: 453–456. "His [Haüy's] theory contains a principle which has in some instances conduced to error and which may affect its worth as a theory more than any consideration of the comparative merit of the goniometer. This principle is an imaginary simplicity which he supposes to exist naturally in the ratios of certain lines either upon or traversing a crystal ... and he is disposed to regard generally the disagreement of an observed measurement with this character rather as an error of the observation than a correction of his theoretic determination."
- Burckhardt, Johann Jakob (1984). "Die Entdeckung der 32 Kristallklassen durch M. L. Frankenheim in Jahre 1826" [The discovery of the 32 crystal classes by M. L. Frankenheim in 1826]. Neues Jahrbuch für Mineralogie - Monatshefte (in German). 31: 481–482.
- Burckhardt, Johann Jakob (1988). Die Symmetrie der Kristalle: Von René-Just Haüy zur kristallographischen Schule in Zürich [The symmetry of crystals: from René-Just Haüy to the crystallographic school in Zurich] (in German). Basel: Birkhäuser. ISBN 9783034860284.
- Burke, John G. (1966). Origins of the science of crystals. Berkeley, CA: University of California Press.
- Burke, John G. (1970). "Sohncke, Leonhard". In Gillispie, Charles Coulston (ed.). Dictionary of scientific biography. Vol. 12. New York: Charles Scribner's Sons. pp. 511–512. ISBN 0684129248. Archived from the original on 16 November 2010.
- Burke, John G. (1972). "Hessel, Johann Friedrich Christian". In Gillispie, Charles Coulston (ed.). Dictionary of scientific biography. Vol. 6. New York: Scribner. pp. 358–359. ISBN 0684101173. Archived from the original on 11 August 2021.
- Burke, John G. (1974). "Naumann, Karl Friedrich". In Gillispie, Charles Coulston (ed.). Dictionary of scientific biography. Vol. 9. New York: C. Scribner's sons. p. 620. ISBN 0684101203. Archived from the original on 17 November 2010.
- Cappeller, Moritz Anton (1723). Prodromus Crystallographiae De Crystallis Improprie Sic Dictis Commentarium [Preliminary treatise on crystallography: a commentary on improperly named crystals] (in Latin). Lucerne: Typis Henrici Rennwardi Wyssing. doi:10.3931/e-rara-86385.
- Carangeot, Arnould (1783). "Goniomètre, ou mesure-angle" [Goniometer, or angle-measure]. Observations sur la physique, sur l'histoire naturelle et sur les arts (in French). 22: 193–197.
- Cardano, Gerolamo (2013) [1550]. Forrester, John M. (ed.). The De subtilitate of Girolamo Cardano. Tempe AZ: Arizona Center for Medieval and Renaissance Studies. ISBN 978-0-86698-484-3.
- Correns, Carl W. (1972). "Frankenheim, Moritz Ludwig". In Gillispie, Charles Coulston (ed.). Dictionary of scientific biography. Vol. 5. New York: Scribner. p. 124. ISBN 0684101165. Archived from the original on 19 October 2022.
- Cromwell, Peter R. (1997). Polyhedra. Cambridge: Cambridge University Press. pp. 318–324. ISBN 9780521554329.
- Cuevas-Diarte, Miguel Ángel; Reverter, Álvarez Santiago (2014). "Commented chronology of crystallography and structural chemistry". Dipòsit Digital. Universitat de Barcelona. hdl:2445/120608.
- Deas, Herbert D. (June 1959). "Crystallography and crystallographers in England in the early nineteenth century: a preliminary survey". Centaurus. 6 (2): 129–148. Bibcode:1959Cent....6..129D. doi:10.1111/j.1600-0498.1959.tb00253.x.
- De Graef, Marc; McHenry, Michael E. (2012). Structure of materials: an introduction to crystallography, diffraction, and symmetry (2nd ed.). New York: Cambridge University Press. ISBN 978-1-107-00587-7.
- Delafosse, G. (1843). "Recherches sur la cristallisation considérée sous les rapports physiques et mathématiques" [Research on crystallization considered from the physical and mathematical perspectives]. Mémoires présentés par divers savants à l'Académie des Sciences de l'Institut de France. Sciences mathématiques et physiques (in French). 8: 641–690.
- Delafosse, G. (1858). Nouveau cours de minéralogie: comprenant la description de toutes les espèces minérales avec leurs applications directes aux arts [New mineralogy course: including description of all mineral species with their direct applications to the arts]. Vol. 1. Paris: A la Librairie Encyclopédique de Roret.
- Delafosse, G. (1860a). Nouveau cours de minéralogie: comprenant la description de toutes les espèces minérales avec leurs applications directes aux arts. Vol. 2. Paris: A la Librairie Encyclopédique de Roret.
- Delafosse, G. (1860b). Nouveau cours de minéralogie: comprenant la description de toutes les espèces minérales avec leurs applications directes aux arts: Atlas. Vol. 3. Paris: A la Librairie Encyclopédique de Roret.
- Eckert, Michael; Schubert, Helmut; Torkar, Gisela; Blondel, Christine; Quédec, Pierre (1992). "The Roots of Solid-State Physics Before Quantum Mechanics". In Hoddeson, Lillian; Braun, Ernest; Teichmann, Jürgen; Weart, Spencer (eds.). Out of the crystal maze: chapters from the history of solid state physics. New York: Oxford University Press. ISBN 0-19-505329-X.
- Engel, Peter (1986). Geometric crystallography: an axiomatic introduction to crystallography. Dordrecht Boston Lancaster: D. Reidel. ISBN 90-277-2339-7.
- Ewald, P. P., ed. (1962). Fifty Years of X-ray Diffraction. Utrecht: Published for International Union of Crystallography by N. V. A. Oosthoek's Uitgeversmaatschappij.
- Fedorov, E. S. (1891). "Симметрія правильныхъ системъ фигуръ" [The symmetry of regular systems of figures]. Записки Императорского С.-Петербургского Минералогического Общества (Proceedings of the Imperial St. Petersburg Mineralogical Society, Series 2) (in Russian). 28: 1–146.
- Fedorov, E. S. (1971). "The symmetry of regular systems of figures". Symmetry of Crystals, American Crystallographic Association Monograph No. 7. Translated by Harker, David; Harker, Katherine. Buffalo, N.Y.: American Crystallographic Association. pp. 50–131.
- Fischer, Walther (1972). "Groth, Paul Heinrich von". In Gillispie, Charles Coulston (ed.). Dictionary of scientific biography. Vol. 5. New York: Scribner. pp. 556–558. ISBN 0684101165. Archived from the original on 19 October 2022.
- Fock, Andreas (1895). Pope, William J. (ed.). An introduction to chemical crystallography. Oxford: Clarendon Press.
- Frankenheim, Moritz Ludwig (1826). "Crystallonomische Aufsätze" [Essays on crystallography]. Isis (Jena) (in German): 497–515, 542–565.
- Frankenheim, Moritz Ludwig (1835). Die Lehre von der Cohäsion, umfassend die Elasticität der Gase, die Elasticität und Cohärenz der flüssigen und festen Körper und die Krystallkunde [Theory of cohesion, encompassing the elasticity of gases, the elasticity and coherence of liquids and solids, and crystallography] (PDF) (in German). Breslau: August Schulz. pp. 311–312. doi:10.3931/e-rara-62635.
- Freudenthal, Hans (1970). "Schoenflies, Arthur Moritz". In Gillispie, Charles Coulston (ed.). Dictionary of scientific biography. Vol. 12. New York: Charles Scribner's Sons. pp. 195–196. ISBN 0684129248. Archived from the original on 16 November 2010.
- Gadolin, Axel V. (1871). "Memoire sur la déduction d'un seul principe de tous les systèmes cristallographiques avec leurs subdivisions" [Deduction of all crystallographic systems and their subdivisions by means of a single general principle]. Acta Societatis Scientiarum Fennicae Helsingfors (in French). 9: 1–71.
- Gal, Joseph (February 2007). "Carl Friedrich Naumann and the introduction of enantio terminology: A review and analysis on the 150th anniversary". Chirality. 19 (2): 89–98. doi:10.1002/chir.20314. PMID 17096375.
- Galiulin, R. V. (November 2003). "To the 150th anniversary of the birth of Evgraf Stepanovich Fedorov (1853–1919): Irregularities in the fate of the theory of regularity". Crystallography Reports. 48 (6): 899–913. Bibcode:2003CryRp..48..899G. doi:10.1134/1.1627430.
- Geiger, Charles A. (August 2016). "A tale of two garnets: The role of solid solution in the development toward a modern mineralogy". American Mineralogist. 101 (8): 1735–1749. Bibcode:2016AmMin.101.1735G. doi:10.2138/am-2016-5522.
- Goodman, D. C. (November 1969). "Problems in Crystallography in the Early Nineteenth Century". Ambix. 16 (3): 152–166. doi:10.1179/amb.1969.16.3.152.
- Goodman, D. C. (1976). "Wollaston, William Hyde". In Gillispie, Charles Coulston (ed.). Dictionary of scientific biography. Vol. 14. New York: Charles Scribner's Sons. pp. 486–494. ISBN 0-684-12926-4. Archived from the original on 17 November 2010.
- Graßmann, Justus Günther (1829). Zur physischen Krystallonomie und geometrischen Combinationslehre [On physical crystallonomy and geometric combination theory] (in German). Stettin: F. H. Morin.
- Groth, P. (1905) [19 August 1904]. On Crystal Structure and its Relation to Chemical Constitution. Report of the seventy-fourth meeting of the British Association for the Advancement of Science held at Cambridge. London: John Murray. pp. 505–509.
- Guglielmini, Domenico (1705) [1688]. Riflessioni filosofiche dedotte dalle figure de' sali [Philosophical reflections deduced from the shapes of salts] (in Italian). Padova: Frambotti.
- Guglielmini, Domenico (1708) [1705]. De salibus dissertatio epistolaris physico-medico-mechanica [On Salts: An Epistolary Dissertation of Physics, Medicine, and Mechanics] (in Latin). Venice: A. Pavinus. Archived from the original on 20 November 2024.
- Hales, Thomas C. (2006). "Historical Overview of the Kepler Conjecture". Discrete & Computational Geometry. 36 (1): 5–20. doi:10.1007/s00454-005-1210-2. ISSN 0179-5376.
- Haüy, René-Just (1782a). "Sur la structure des cristaux de grenat" [On the structure of garnet crystals]. Observations sur la physique, sur l'histoire naturelle et sur les arts (in French). 19: 366–370.
- Haüy, René-Just (1782b). "Sur la structure des cristaux des spaths calcaires" [On the crystal structure of calcareous spars]. Observations sur la physique, sur l'histoire naturelle et sur les arts (in French). 20: 33–39.
- Haüy, René-Just (1784). Essai d'une théorie sur la structure des crystaux, appliquée à plusieurs genres de substances crystallisées [Attempt at a theory on the structure of crystals, applied to several kinds of crystallized substances] (in French). Paris: Gogué et Née de La Rochelle. Archived from the original on 26 September 2016.
- Haüy, René-Just (1801). Traité de Minéralogie [Mineralogical treatise] (in French). Vol. 1–5. Paris: Chez Louis.
- Haüy, René-Just (1 April 1808). "Sur l'arragonite" [On aragonite] (PDF). Journal des Mines (in French). 23 (136): 241–270.
- Haüy, René Just (1815a). "Sur une Loi de la Cristallisation, appelée Loi de symétrie" [On a Law of Crystallization, called the Law of Symmetry]. Journal des mines (in French). 37: 215–235, 347–369.
- Haüy, René Just (1815b). "Sur une Loi de la Cristallisation, appelée Loi de symétrie". Journal des mines (in French). 38: 5–34, 161–174.
- Haüy, René Just (1822). Traité de cristallographie [Crystallographic treatise] (in French). Paris: Bachelier.
- Hessel, Johann Friedrich Christian (1897) [1830]. Krystallometrie, oder, Krystallonomie und Krystallographie [Crystallometry, or, Crystallonomy and Crystallography]. Ostwald's Klassiker der exakten Wissenschaften Bd. 88/89 (in German). Leipzig: Wilhelm Engelmann.
- Hilton, Harold (1963) [1903]. "History of the structure-theories". Mathematical Crystallography and The Theory of Groups of Movements. New York: Dover. pp. 258–259.
- Hoffmann, Frank (2020). Introduction to crystallography (1st ed.). Cham, Switzerland: Springer. ISBN 978-3-030-35109-0.
- Holser, William T. (1976). "Weiss, Christian Samuel". In Gillispie, Charles Coulston (ed.). Dictionary of scientific biography. Vol. 14. New York: C. Scribner's sons. pp. 239–242. ISBN 0684129264. Archived from the original on 17 November 2010.
- Holser, William T. (1981). "Barlow, William". In Gillispie, Charles Coulston (ed.). Dictionary of scientific biography. Vol. 1. New York: Charles Scribner's Sons. pp. 460–463. ISBN 0-684-16963-0. Archived from the original on 10 September 2012.
- Hon, Giora; Goldstein, Bernard R. (2008). From Summetria to Symmetry: The Making of a Revolutionary Scientific Concept. Dordrecht: Springer Netherlands. pp. 188–198. ISBN 9781402084478.
- Hooke, Robert (1665). Micrographia. London: The Royal Society.
- Hooykaas, R. (1972). "Haüy, René-Just". In Gillispie, Charles Coulston (ed.). Dictionary of scientific biography. Vol. 6. New York: Scribner. pp. 178–183. ISBN 0684101173. Archived from the original on 11 August 2021.
- Hooykaas, R. (1981). "Romé De L'Isle, Jean-Baptiste Louis". In Gillispie, Charles Coulston (ed.). Dictionary of scientific biography. Vol. 11. New York: Charles Scribner's & Sons. pp. 520–524. ISBN 0684169681. Archived from the original on 24 October 2011.
- Huyghens, Christiaan (1690). Traité de la lumière [Treatise on light] (in French). Leiden: Pieter van der Aa.
- Jordan, C. (August 1868). "Mémoire sur les groupes de mouvements" [Memoir on movement groups]. Annali di Matematica Pura ed Applicata (in French). 2 (1): 167–215. doi:10.1007/BF02419610.
- Kahr, Bart; McBride, J. Michael (January 1992). "Optically Anomalous Crystals". Angewandte Chemie International Edition in English. 31 (1): 1–26. doi:10.1002/anie.199200013.
- Kaiser, Walter (1987). "Symmetries in romantic physics". In Doncel, Manuel D.; Hermann, Armin; Michel, Louis; Pais, Abraham (eds.). Symmetries in physics (1600–1980). Barcelona: Universitat Autònoma de Barcelona. pp. 77–92.
- Katzir, Shaul (September 2004). "The emergence of the principle of symmetry in physics". Historical Studies in the Physical and Biological Sciences. 35 (1): 35–65. doi:10.1525/hsps.2004.35.1.35.
- Kepler, Johannes (1611). Strena seu de Nive Sexangula [A New Year's Gift of Hexagonal Snow] (in Latin). Frankfurt: G. Tampach.
- Kepler, Johannes (1966). Hardie, Colin (ed.). The Six-Cornered Snowflake. Oxford: Oxford University Press. ISBN 978-0-19-858120-8.
- Kraus, Edward H. (1918). "Haüys contribution to our knowledge of isomorphism". The American Mineralogist. 3 (6): 126–130.
- Kubbinga, Henk (January 2012). "Crystallography from Haüy to Laue: controversies on the molecular and atomistic nature of solids". Zeitschrift für Kristallographie. 227 (1): 1–26. Bibcode:2012ZK....227....1K. doi:10.1524/zkri.2012.1459.
- Kunz, George F. (1918). "The life and work of Haüy". The American Mineralogist. 3: 60–89.
- Ladd, Marcus Frederick Charles (2014). Symmetry of crystals and molecules. Oxford: Oxford University Press. pp. 13–15. ISBN 9780199670888.
- Lalena, John N. (April 2006). "From quartz to quasicrystals: probing nature's geometric patterns in crystalline substances". Crystallography Reviews. 12 (2): 125–180. Bibcode:2006CryRv..12..125L. doi:10.1080/08893110600838528.
- Linnaeus, Carl (1806) [1735]. A general system of nature. Vol. 7: Minerals. London: Lackington, Allen, and Co.
- Lomonosov, Mikhail (1959) [1749]. "Dissertation on the Origin and Nature of Niter". Mikhail Vasil Evich Lomonosov on the Corpuscular Theory. Translated by Leicester, Henry M. Moscow and Leningrad: Academy Of Sciences.
- M., H. A. (21 January 1928). "Prof. P. H. Von Groth, For. Mem. R.S.". Nature. 121 (3038): 98–107. Bibcode:1928Natur.121...98H. doi:10.1038/121098a0.
- Maitte, Bernard (2001). "René-Just Haüy (1743–1822) et la naissance de la cristallographie" [René-Just Haüy (1743–1822) and the birth of crystallography]. Travaux du Comité français d'Histoire de la Géologie (in French). 15: 115–149.
- Maitte, Bernard (2013). "The Construction of Group Theory in Crystallography". In Barbin, E.; Pisano, R. (eds.). The Dialectic Relation Between Physics and Mathematics in the XIXth Century. History of Mechanism and Machine Science. Vol. 16. Dordrecht: Springer. pp. 15–18. doi:10.1007/978-94-007-5380-8_1. ISBN 978-94-007-5380-8.
- Mascarenhas, Yvonne Primerano (2020). "Crystallography before the Discovery of X-Ray Diffraction". Revista Brasileira de Ensino de Física. 42 e20190336. doi:10.1590/1806-9126-RBEF-2019-0336.
- Mauskopf, Seymour H. (July 1976). "Crystals and compounds: molecular structure and composition in nineteenth-century French science". Transactions of the American Philosophical Society. New Series. 66 (3): 5–82. doi:10.2307/1006279. ISBN 0871696630. JSTOR 1006279.
- Mauskopf, Seymour (30 April 2012). "Seeds to Symmetry to Structure: Crystallography and the Search for Atomic-Molecular Arrangement". Crystallography: Defining the Shape of Our Modern World. University of Illinois at Urbana-Champaign.
- Mauskopf, Seymour H. (3 April 2015). "William Barlow and the Determination of Atomic Arrangement in Crystals: Essay in Honour of Alan J. Rocke". Annals of Science. 72 (2): 206–223. doi:10.1080/00033790.2015.1007524. PMID 26104165.
- Mayer, Gaston (1977). "Kappeler (Cappeler), Moritz Anton". Neue Deutsche Biographie (in German). Vol. 11. Berlin: Duncker & Humblot. pp. 138–139. (full text online).
- McKie, Duncan (1974). "Miller, William Hallowes". In Gillispie, Charles Coulston (ed.). Dictionary of scientific biography. Vol. 9. New York: Charles Scribner's Sons. pp. 392–393. ISBN 0684101203. Archived from the original on 17 November 2010.
- Melhado, Evan M. (1 January 1980). "Mitscherlich's Discovery of Isomorphism". Historical Studies in the Physical Sciences. 11 (1): 87–123. doi:10.2307/27757472. JSTOR 27757472.
- Metzger, Hélène (1969) [1918]. La Gènese de la Science de Cristaux [The genesis of the science of crystals] (in French). Paris: Albert Blanchard. pp. 67–68. Archived from the original on 2 October 2021.
- Miller, William Hallowes (1839). A treatise on crystallography. Cambridge: J. & J. J. Deighton. p. 1.
- "Miller indices". Online Dictionary of Crystallography. International Union of Crystallography. 11 December 2017.
- Minnigerode, B. (1884). "Untersuchungen über die Symmetrieverhältnisse und die Elasticität der Krystalle" [Investigation of the symmetry relations and elasticity of crystals]. Nachrichten von der Königl. Gesellschaft der Wissenschaften und der Georg-Augusts-Universität zu Göttingen (in German): 374–384.
- Minnigerode, B. (1887). "Untersuchungen über die Symmetrieverhältnisse der Krystalle" [Investigation of the symmetry relations of the crystal]. Neues Jahrbuch für Mineralogie, Geologie und Paläontologie (in German). 5: 145–166.
- Mitscherlich, E. (1819). "Ueber die Krystallisation der Salze, in denen das Metall der Basis mit zwei Proportionen Sauerstoff verbunden ist" [About the crystallisation of salts in which the base metal is connected with two proportions of oxygen]. Abhandlungen der Königlichen Akademie der Wissenschaften zu Berlin (in German): 427–437. Archived from the original on 12 January 2019.
- Mohs, Friedrich (1820). The Characters of the Classes, Orders, Genera, and Species Or, The Characteristic of the Natural History System of Mineralogy. Intended to Enable Student of Discriminate Minerals on Principles Similar to Those of Botany and Zoology. Edinburgh: W. and C. Tait.
- Mohs, Friedrich (1821). Die Charaktere der Klassen, Ordnungen, Geschlechter und Arten: Oder die Charakteristik des naturhistorischen Mineral-Systemess [The characters of classes, orders, genera and species: or the characteristics of the natural-historical mineral systems] (in German). Dresden: Arnoldische Buchhandlung.
- Mohs, Friedrich (1822). Grundriss der Mineralogie [Outline of mineralogy] (in German). Dresden: Arnoldischen Buchhandlung.
- Mohs, F. (1823). "On the crystallographic discoveries and systems of Weiss and Mohs". The Edinburgh Philosophical Journal. 8: 275–290. "But the measurements, or rather the indications of the angles of Haüy, have, in so. many instances, been found incorrect, that we can no longer attach any certainty to their exactness"
- Moser, Tijmen Jan; Robinson, Enders A. (2024). "Anisotropy and Ellipsoidal Wavelets". Walking with Christiaan Huygens: from Archimedes' influence to unsung contributions in modern science. Cham: Springer. pp. 74–80. doi:10.1007/978-3-031-46158-3. ISBN 978-3-031-46157-6.
- Naumann, Carl Friedrich (1824). "Ueber plagiobasische Crystall-Systeme" [About plagiobasic crystal systems]. Isis (Jena) (in German): 954–959.
- Naumann, Carl Friedrich (1826). Grundriss der Kristallographie [Outline of crystallography] (in German). Leipzig: Johann Ambrosius Barth.
- Naumann, Carl Friedrich (1830a). Lehrbuch der reinen und angewandten Krystallographie [Textbook of pure and applied crystallography] (in German). Vol. 1. Leipzig: F. A. Brockhaus.
- Naumann, Carl Friedrich (1830b). Lehrbuch der reinen und angewandten Krystallographie [Textbook of pure and applied crystallography] (in German). Vol. 2. Leipzig: F. A. Brockhaus.
- Neumann, F. E. (1823). Beiträge zur Krystallonomie [Contributions to crystallonomy] (in German). Berlin und Posen: Ernst Siegfried Mittler. p. xvi.
- Neumann, F. E. (January 1832). "Theorie der doppelten Strahlenbrechung, abgeleitet aus den Gleichungen der Mechanik" [Theory of double beam refraction, derived from the equations of mechanics]. Annalen der Physik (in German). 101 (7): 418–454. Bibcode:1832AnP...101..418N. doi:10.1002/andp.18321010703.
- Nicol, James (1878). "Crystallography". Encyclopedia Britannica. Vol. 6 (9th ed.). New York: Charles Scribner's Sons. pp. 671–677. Archived from the original on 13 March 2021.
- Oldroyd, D. R. (1 November 1974). "Some Neo-Platonic and Stoic Influences on Mineralogy in the Sixteenth and Seventeenth Centuries". Ambix. 21 (2–3): 128–156. doi:10.1179/000269874790223614.
- Paufler, Peter (18 December 2019). "William Barlow's early publications in the 'Zeitschrift für Krystallographie und Mineralogie' and their influence on crystal structure research". Zeitschrift für Kristallographie - Crystalline Materials. 234 (11–12): 769–785. doi:10.1515/zkri-2019-0044.
- Paufler, Peter; Filatov, Stanislav K. (18 February 2020). "E. S. Fedorov Promoting the Russian-German Scientific Interrelationship". Minerals. 10 (2): 181. Bibcode:2020Mine...10..181P. doi:10.3390/min10020181.
- Pertlik, Franz (2006). "Argumente für die Existenz eines diklinen Kristallsystems in der Fachliteratur des 19. Jahrhunderts. Ein Beitrag zur Geschichte der Kristallographie" [Arguments for the existence of a diclinic crystal system in the specialist literature of the 19th century. A contribution to the history of crystallography] (PDF). Mitteilungen der Österreichischen Mineralogischen Gesellschaft (in German). 152: 17–29.
- Phillips, F. C. (1957). An Introduction To Crystallography (3rd ed.). New York: John Wiley & Sons. pp. 12–14.
- Robertson, Edmund F.; O'Connor, John J. "The MacTutor History of Mathematics Archive: Biographies". School of Mathematics and Statistics, University of St Andrews.
- Romé de L'Isle, Jean Baptiste Louis de (1772). Essai de cristallographie: ou, Description des figures géométriques, propres à différens corps du regne minéral connus vulgairement sous le nom de Cristaux [Crystallographic essay, or, Description of geometric figures, specific to different bodies of the mineral kingdom known vulgarly as crystals] (in French). Paris: Didot jeune. p. 10. "Germs being inadmissible for explaining the formation of crystals, it is necessary to suppose that the integrant molecules of bodies have each, according to its own nature, a constant and determinate figure. [translation]"
- Romé de L'Isle, Jean Baptiste Louis de (1783). Cristallographie, ou, Description des formes propres à tous les corps du regne minéral [Crystallography, or, Description of the forms specific to all bodies in the mineral kingdom] (in French). Paris: De l'imprimerie de Monsieur.
- Rowlinson, J. S. (2002). Cohesion: A Scientific History of Intermolecular Forces. Cambridge University Press. ISBN 9781139435888. Archived from the original on 13 April 2022.
- Scholz, Erhard (1989a). "Crystallographic Symmetry Concepts and Group Theory (1850–1860)". In Rowe, David E.; McCleary, John (eds.). The history of modern mathematics: proceedings of the Symposium on the history of modern mathematics, Vassar college, Poughkeepsie, New York, June 20-24, 1988. New York London Toronto: Academic Press. pp. 3–27. ISBN 0125996624.
- Scholz, Erhard (1989b). "The Rise of Symmetry Concepts in the Atomistic and Dynamistic Schools of Crystallography, 1815-1830". Revue d'histoire des sciences. 42 (1–2): 110–122. doi:10.3406/rhs.1989.4136.
- Scholz, Erhard (1989c). Symmetrie, Gruppe, Dualität [Symmetry, group, duality] (PDF) (in German). Basel Boston Berlin: Birkhäuser. ISBN 3764319747.
- Scholz, Erhard (1994). "Crystallography". In Grattan-Guinness, I. (ed.). Companion Encyclopedia of the History and Philosophy of the Mathematical Sciences. Vol. 2. London: Routledge. pp. 1269–1274. ISBN 9780415092395.
- Scholz, Erhard (1996). "The Influence of Justus Grassmann's Crystallographic Works on Hermann Grassmann". In Schubring, G. (ed.). Hermann Günther Graßmann (1809–1877): Visionary Mathematician, Scientist and Neohumanist Scholar. Boston Studies in the Philosophy of Science. Vol. 187. pp. 37–45. doi:10.1007/978-94-015-8753-2_5. ISBN 978-94-015-8753-2.
- Schönflies, Arthur (1891). Kristallsysteme und Kristallstruktur [Crystal system and crystal structure] (in German). Leipzig: Druck und Verlag von B.G. Teubner. Archived from the original on 2 July 2009.
- Schuh, Curtis P. (2007a). Mineralogy & Crystallography: On the History of these Sciences through 1919. Curtis Schuh.
- Schuh, Curtis P. (2007b). Mineralogy and Crystallography: An Annotated Biobibliography of Books Published 1469 to 1919. Vol. 2. Archived from the original on 25 August 2007.
- Schneer, Cecil (December 1960). "Kepler's New Year's Gift of a Snowflake". Isis. 51 (4): 531–545. doi:10.1086/349411. JSTOR 228611.
- Seeber, Ludwig August (1824). "Versuch einer Erklärung des inneren Baues der Festen Körper" [Attempt to explain the inner structure of solid bodies]. Annalen der Physik (in German). 76 (3): 229–248, 349–371. Bibcode:1824AnP....76..229S. doi:10.1002/andp.18240760302.
- Senechal, Marjorie (1990a). Crystalline symmetries: an informal mathematical introduction. Bristol; Philadelphia: Adam Hilger. ISBN 9780750300414.
- Senechal, Marjorie (1990b). "Brief history of geometrical crystallography". In Lima-de-Faria, J. (ed.). Historical atlas of crystallography. Dordrecht; Boston: Published for International Union of Crystallography by Kluwer Academic Publishers. pp. 43–59. ISBN 079230649X.
- Shafranovskii, I. I.; Belov, N. V. (1962). "E. S. Fedorov". In Ewald, P. P. (ed.). 50 Years of X-Ray Diffraction. Utrecht: Published for International Union of Crystallography by N. V. A. Oosthoek's Uitgeversmaatschappij. pp. 341–351.
- Shinn, Terry (2013). "The silicon tide". In Buchwald, Jed Z.; Fox, Robert (eds.). The Oxford handbook of the history of physics (First ed.). Oxford; New York, NY: Oxford University Press. p. 868. ISBN 978-0-19-969625-3. "Much pre-twentieth-century study of crystals focused on their geometry, and mathematical description became increasingly central. There was then little reflection on the mechanical, optical, and electrical properties of crystals. This changed early in the twentieth century ..."
- Sohncke, Leonhard (1879). Entwicklung einer Theorie der Kristallstruktur [Development of a theory of crystal structure] (in German). Leipzig: Teubner.
- Sohncke, L. (1884). "Probable Nature of the Internal Symmetry of Crystals". Nature. 29 (747): 383–384. Bibcode:1884Natur..29..383S. doi:10.1038/029383a0. S2CID 4072817.
- Sohncke, L. (1 December 1888). "Erweiterung der Theorie der Krystallstructur" [Extension of the theory of crystal structure]. Zeitschrift für Kristallographie (in German). 14 (1–6): 426–446. doi:10.1524/zkri.1888.14.1.426.
- Sohncke, L. (1 November 1891). "Die Entdeckung des Eintheilungsprincips der Krystalle durch J. F. C. Hessel" [The discovery of the classification principle of crystals by J. F. C. Hessel]. Zeitschrift für Kristallographie (in German). 18 (1–6): 486–498. doi:10.1524/zkri.1891.18.1.486.>
- "Sohncke groups". Online Dictionary of Crystallography. International Union of Crystallography. 3 April 2019.
- Sollas, W. (1898). "On the intimate structure of crystals. Parts I, II & III. Crystals of the cubic system with cubic cleavage". Proceedings of the Royal Society of London. 63: 270–300. doi:10.1098/rspl.1898.0035.
- Spencer, Leonard James (1910). "Crystallography". Encyclopedia Britannica. Vol. 7 (11th ed.). New York: Cambridge University. p. 570.
- Steno, Nicolas (1669). De solido intra solidum naturaliter contento (in Latin). Florence: Star.
- Steno, Nicolaus (1916) [1669]. The prodromus of Nicolaus Steno's dissertation concerning a solid body enclosed by process of nature within a solid. Translated by Winter, John Garrett. New York, London: The Macmillan Company. p. 272. "Figures 5 and 6 belong to the class of those which I could present in countless numbers to prove that in the plane of the axis both the number and the length of the sides are changed in various ways without changing the angles."
- Stillwell, Charles W. (1938). Crystal chemistry. New York and London: McGraw-Hill Book Company.
- Swartz, C. K. (1 January 1909). "Proposed classification of crystals based on the recognition of seven fundamental types of symmetry". Geological Society of America Bulletin. 20 (1): 369–398. Bibcode:1909GSAB...20..369S. doi:10.1130/gsab-20-369.
- Szpiro, George (2003). Kepler's conjecture: how some of the greatest minds in history helped solve one of the oldest math problems in the world. Hoboken, N.J: John Wiley & Sons. ISBN 9780471086017.
- Taylor, Kenneth L. (1978). "Delafosse, Gabriel". In Gillispie, Charles Coulston (ed.). Dictionary of scientific biography: Topical essays. Vol. 15 (Supplement 1). New York: C. Scribner's sons. pp. 114–115. ISBN 0684147793. Archived from the original on 19 September 2020.
- Tutton, A. E. H. (1922). Crystallography and practical crystal measurement. Vol. 2. London: Macmillan.
- Usselman, Melvyn C. (1986). "The Reflective Goniometer and its Impact on Chemical Theory". In Stock, J. T.; Orna, M. V. (eds.). The History and Preservation of Chemical Instrumentation. pp. 33–40. doi:10.1007/978-94-009-4690-3_4. ISBN 978-94-010-8585-4.
- Usselman, Melvyn C. (2015). Pure intelligence: the life of William Hyde Wollaston. Chicago; London: The University of Chicago Press. ISBN 9780226245737.
- Vainshtein, B. K. (2010). Fundamentals of Crystals: Symmetry, and Methods of Structural Crystallography (2nd enlarged ed.). Berlin: Springer Berlin. ISBN 978-3-642-08153-8.
- Weiss, Christian Samuel (1804). "Dynamische Ansicht der Krystallisation" [Dynamical view of crystallization]. Lehrbuch der Mineralogie [Traité de minéralogie (René Just Haüy)] (appendix) (in German). Vol. 1. Paris and Leipzig: C. H. Reclam. pp. 365–389.
- Weiss, Christian Samuel (1809). De indagando formarum crystallinarum charactere geometrico principali dissertatio [Dissertation on the investigation of the principal geometric character of crystalline forms] (Dissertation) (in Latin). Leipzig: Carolus Tauchnitz.
- Weiss, Christian Samuel (1814–1815). "Uebersichtliche Darstellung der verschiedenen natürlichen Abtheilungen der Krystallisations-Systeme" [Overview of the various natural divisions of the crystallographic system]. Abhandlungen der physikalischen Klasse der Königlich-Preussischen Akademie der Wissenschaften (in German): 289–337.
- Weiss, Christian Samuel (1816–1817). "Ueber eine verbesserte Methode für die Bezeichnung der verschiedenen Flächen eines Krystallisationssystems, nebst Bemerkungen über den Zustand der Polarisierung der Seiten in den Linien der krystallinischen Structur" [An improved method for the designation of the different surfaces of a crystallization system, together with remarks on the state of polarization of the sites in the lines of the crystalline structure]. Abhandlungen der physikalischen Klasse der Königlich-Preussischen Akademie der Wissenschaften (in German): 286–336.
- Weiss, C. S. (1822). "On the methodical and natural distribution of the different systems of crystallization". The Edinburgh Philosophical Journal. 8: 103–110.
- Werner, A. G. (1785) [1774]. Von den äuẞerlichen Kennzeichen der Foẞilien [On the external characteristics of fossils] (in German). Johann Thomas Edlen von Trattnern.
- Werner, A. G. (1962) [1774]. On the external characters of minerals. Translated by Carozzi, Albert V. Urbana: University of Illinois Press.
- Whewell, W. (31 December 1825). "A general method of calculating the angles made by any planes of crystals, and the laws according to which they are formed". Philosophical Transactions of the Royal Society of London. 115 (115): 87–130. doi:10.1098/rstl.1825.0006.
- Whewell, William (2011) [1837]. "Prelude to the Epoch of De L'Isle and Haüy". History of the Inductive Sciences: From the Earliest to the Present Times (Online ed.). Cambridge: Cambridge University Press. pp. 191–197. doi:10.1017/cbo9780511734359.027. ISBN 978-1-108-01926-2. "Nevertheless since there is here a principle of crystallization, the inclination of the planes and of the angles is always constant."
- Whitlock, Herbert P. (1934). "A century of progress in crystallography" (PDF). American Mineralogist. 19 (3): 93–100.
- Wigner, E. P. (September 1968). "Symmetry Principles in Old and New Physics" (PDF). Bulletin of the American Mathematical Society. 74 (5): 793–815. doi:10.1090/S0002-9904-1968-12047-6.
- Wollaston, William Hyde (1809). "Description of a reflective goniometer". Philosophical Transactions of the Royal Society of London. 99: 253–258. doi:10.1098/rstl.1809.0018.
- Wollaston, William Hyde (31 December 1813). "The Bakerian Lecture. On the elementary particles of certain crystals". Philosophical Transactions of the Royal Society of London. 103 (103): 51–63. doi:10.1098/rstl.1813.0008. JSTOR 107387.
