= Axel Gadolin =

Finnish/Russian crystallographer and general

Axel Vilhelmovich Gadolin
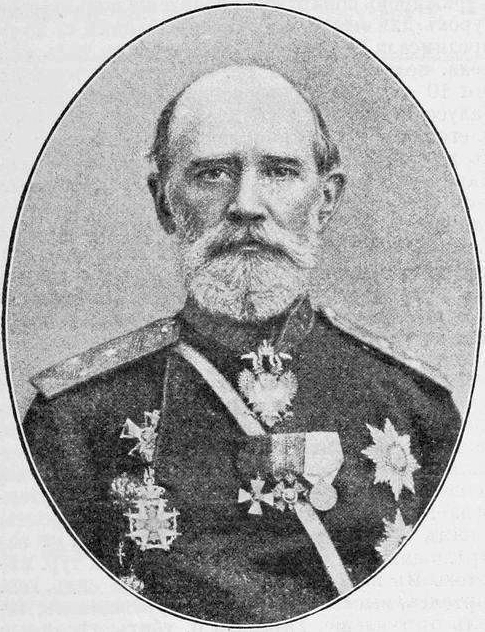
- Аксель Вильгельмович Гадолин
- Born: June 12, 1828; Somero, Grand Duchy of Finland
- Died: December 15, 1892 (aged 64); Saint Petersburg, Russia
- Burial place: Helsingfors, Finland
- Spouse: Fanny Elisabeth von Wendt (1847–1924)
- Military career
- Allegiance: Imperial Russia
- Branch: Artillery
- Rank: Lieutenant General 1876
- Awards: : Lomonosov Prize 1868; Saint Petersburg University Doctor of mineralogy 1869; St. Petersburg Academy of Sciences Academician 1890
- Scientific career
- Known for: Deriving the 32 crystallographic point groups using stereographic projection
- Fields: Mineralogy, crystallography
- Workplaces: Mikhailov Artillery Academy Lecturer 1849, Professor 1866; Saint Petersburg Institute of Technology Professor 1872

Axel Vilhelmovich Gadolin (Russian: Аксель Вильгельмович Гадолин; 12 June 1828 – 15 December 1892) was a Finnish/Russian lieutenant general, and also a scientist in the field of artillery, metallurgy, mineralogy and crystallography. Gadolin was a professor at the Mikhailov Artillery Academy and the Saint Petersburg Institute of Technology, doctor of mineralogy from Saint Petersburg University, and academician of the St. Petersburg Academy of Sciences. He was awarded the Lomonosov Prize in 1868 for his work on crystallographic point groups.

== Career ==
Gadolin was born in Somero in the Grand Duchy of Finland on 12 June 1828. He was the nephew of the chemist Johan Gadolin.

Gadolin combined his military career with a scientific career in mineralogy, crystallography, and artillery sciences. Gadolin received his initial education at the Finnish Cadet School. In 1847 he was a second lieutenant in the Russian artillery service. Gadolin graduated from the Mikhailov Artillery Academy in 1849 and remained their to teach; his initial appointment was as a lecturer in physics. He was appointed director of the artillery school in 1856 (and promoted to captain), and then professor in 1866. In 1859 he was promoted to colonel, and in 1866 to major general. While at the artillery school he developed techniques for building high velocity canons, which significantly increased the range that a shell could be propelled.

In 1869 he was awarded an honorary doctorate of mineralogy by the council of Saint Petersburg University. In 1872 he became professor at Saint Petersburg Institute of Technology. Gadolin was promoted to lieutenant general in 1876.

== Works ==
Gadolin published in the fields of artillery, mechanical engineering, metallurgy, mineralogy and crystallography.

Gadolin's most famous scientific work is entitled Deduction of all Crystallographic Systems and their Subdivisions by Means of a Single General Principle. It was first published in Russian in 1867, reprinted in 1954, translated into French in 1871, and German in 1896.

In this work Gadolin used the law of rational indices to prove that only 2-, 3-, 4-, and 6-fold axes are possible in crystals. He showed that it is possible to derive all the crystallographically possible polyhedra by studying how the elements of symmetry can be combined. Gadolin showed that the resulting polyhedra can be divided into 32 classes varying by symmetry. Gadolin stated that two crystals should belong to the same class if they have the same symmetry elements, identically disposed. This is the foundation of the modern classification into geometric crystal classes. Although he predicted 32 crystal classes, Gadolin found only 20 examples in nature. Gadolin work was often cited as the most important source for the systematic derivation of the crystal classes without using the concepts of group theory.

Moritz Ludwig Frankenheim in 1826 and Johann F. C. Hessel in 1830 had found the 32 crystal classes. Gadolin, who was unaware of the work of his predecessors, found them independently using stereographic projection to represent the symmetry elements of the 32 groups. Gadolin's work had a clarity that attracted widespread attention, and caused Hessel's earlier work to be neglected. Gadolin influenced the later crystallographic work of Paul Groth.

In 1883 Evgraf Fedorov completed his Elements of the theory of figures; Gadolin assisted in its eventual publication in 1885. Fedorov and Arthur Moritz Schoenflies added new symmetry elements such as glide reflection to those considered by Gadolin; using these new symmetry elements they enumerated the 230 space groups in three dimensions in 1891.

Gadolin's mineral collection is held at the Finnish Museum of Natural History.

== Honours and awards ==
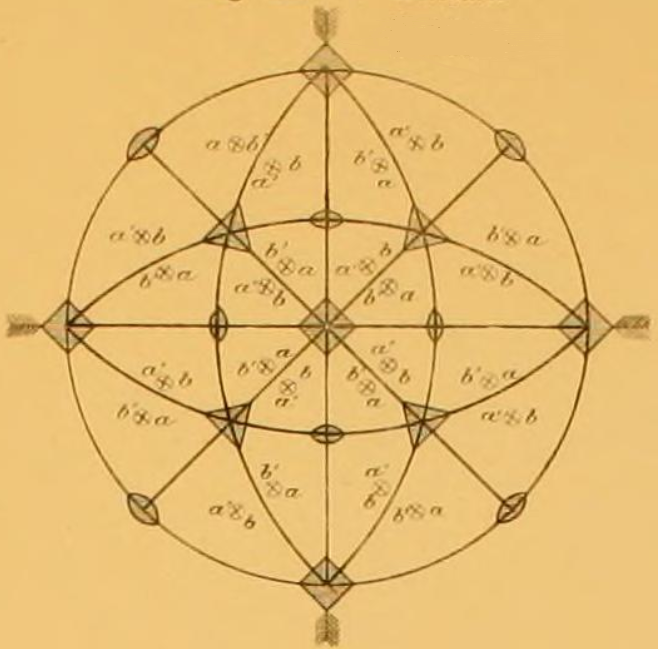
Stereographic projection of the homohedral form of the cubic system. The grey triangles and squares indicate rotation axes of order 3 and 4, respectively, and the grey ellipses indicate mirror planes.

=== Military ===
Gadolin was the recipient of numerous military awards.

- Order of Saint Anna, 3rd class, 1859; 2nd class, 1864; 1st class 1872
- Order of St. Vladimir, 4th class 1862; 3rd class 1868; 2nd class 1875
- Legion of Honour, commander (3rd class), 1867 (France)
- Order of Saint Stanislaus, 1st class, 1870
- Order of St. George, 4th class, 1871
- Order of the White Eagle, 1879
- Order of Saint Alexander Nevsky, 1884
- Order of the Sword, commander grand cross (1st class), 1885 (Sweden)

=== Academic ===
- Lomonosov Prize, 1868 for his work on crystallographic point groups
- Saint Petersburg University, honorary doctorate of mineralogy, 1869
- St. Petersburg Academy of Sciences, corresponding member, 1873; extraordinary academician, 1875; full academician, 1890
- The mineral Axelite was named in honour of Axel Gadolin.

== See also ==
- Geometrical crystallography before X-rays
