= William Barlow (geologist) =

British geologist

- Barlow in 1917
- Born: 8 August 1845; Islington, London, England
- Died: 28 February 1934 (aged 88); Great Stanmore, Middlesex, England
- Known for: Determining the 230 space groups
- Awards: Fellow of the Royal Society
- Scientific career
- Fields: Crystallography

William Barlow FRS (8 August 1845 – 28 February 1934) was an English amateur geologist specialising in crystallography.

He was born in Islington, in London, England. His father became wealthy as a speculative builder as well as a building surveyor, allowing William to have a private education. After his father died in 1875, William and his brother inherited this fortune, allowing him to pursue his interest in crystallography without the need to labour for a living.

William examined the forms of crystalline structures and deduced that there were only 230 forms of symmetrical crystal arrangements, known as space groups. His results were published in 1894, after they had been independently announced by Evgraf Fedorov and Arthur Schönflies, although his approach did display some novelty. His structural models of simple compounds such as NaCl and CsCl were later confirmed using X-ray crystallography.

He served as the president of the English Mineralogical Society from 1915 until 1918.

He died in Great Stanmore, Middlesex, England.

== Awards and honours ==
- Fellow of the Royal Society, 1908.
- The wrinkle ridge Dorsa Barlow on the Moon was named after him.
- The mineral barlowite, Cu_{4}FBr(OH)_{6}, approved in 2010, was named in his honor.

== See also ==
- Chemical crystallography before X-rays
- Geometrical crystallography before X-rays
