= Domenico Guglielmini =

Italian mathematician, chemist and physician (1655–1710)

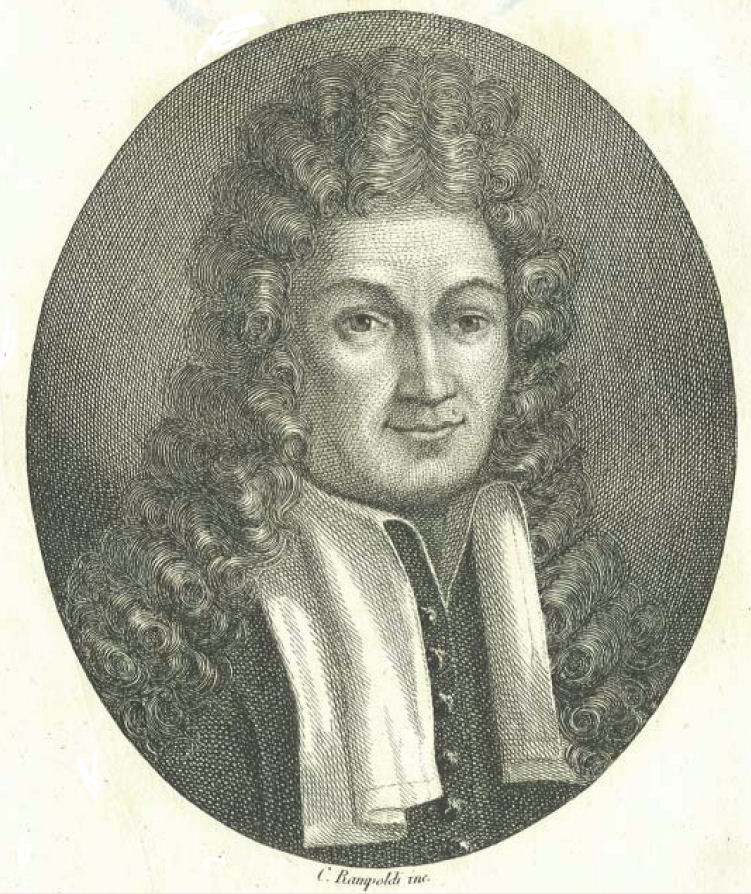
- Lithography of Domenico Guglielmini (1821)
- Born: 27 September 1655; Bologna, Papal States
- Died: 27 July 1710 (aged 54); Padua, Republic of Venice
- Resting place: San Massimo (Padua)
- Education: University of Bologna
- Spouse: Costanza Gioannetti
- Parent(s): Giulio Guglielmini and Gentile Guglielmini (née Neri)
- Scientific career
- Fields: mathematics; chemistry; medicine; physics
- Workplaces: University of Bologna; University of Padua

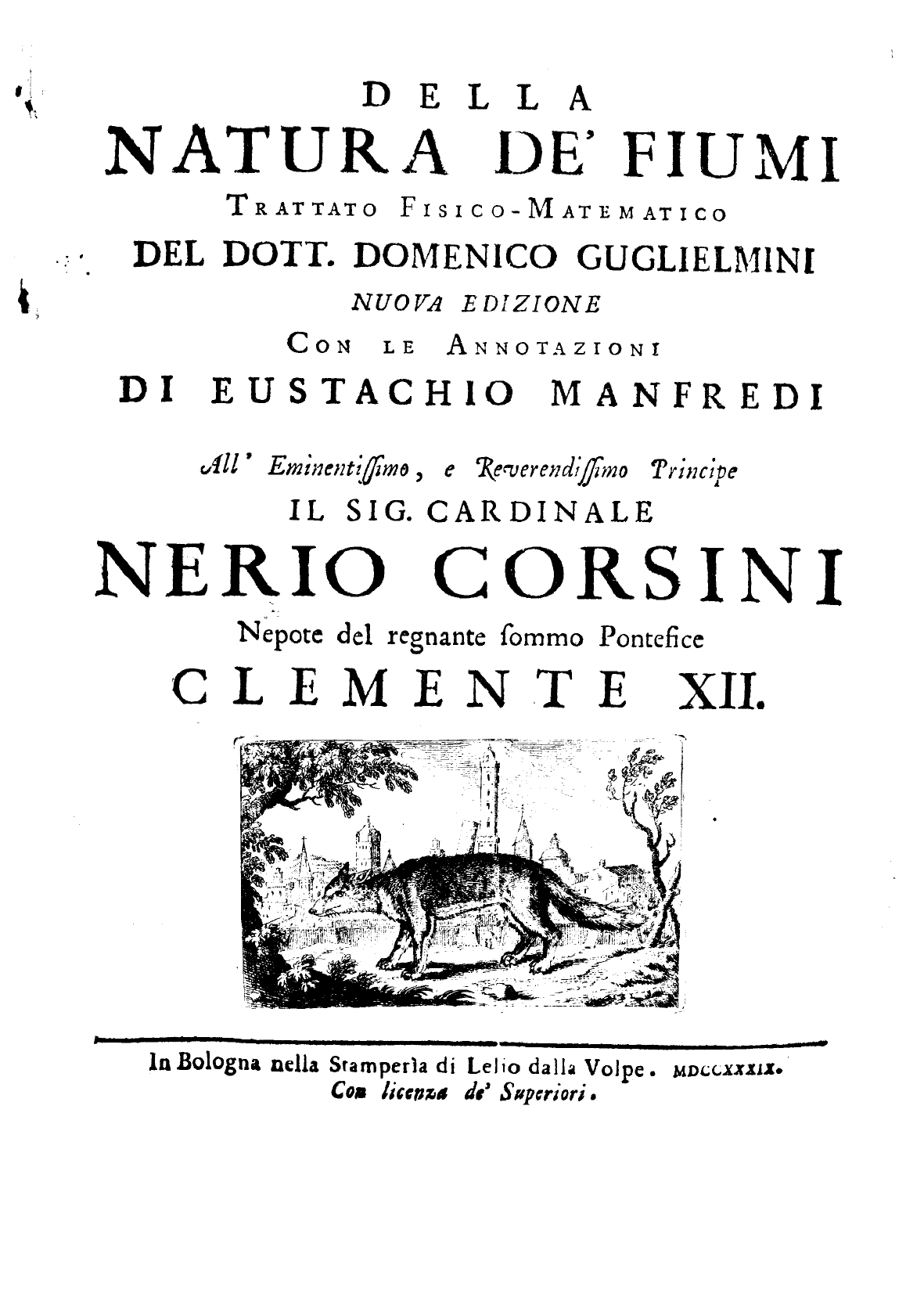
Incipit della Natura dei fiumi

Domenico Guglielmini FRS (Bologna, 27 September 1655 - Padua, 27 July 1710) was an Italian mathematician, chemist and physician, active and successful mainly in Bologna and Padua.

== Life ==
Born in Bologna to a well-off family, he graduated in medicine in 1678 with Marcello Malpighi at the University of Bologna, at the same time he studied mathematics with Geminiano Montanari and became a member of the Academia della Traccia o dei Filosofi.

His first mathematical writing topic was astronomy, but later he focused his studies on hydraulics. In 1686 he was named "Bologna General Water Administrator", an important role due to the large number of watercourses existing in the area and the frequent flooding that required surveillance. The experience gave inspiration for his well-known work "Della natura dei fiumi" which is considered a masterpiece of modern river hydraulics.

Guglielmini was elected an associated member of the French Academy of Sciences in 1686 and a fellow of the Royal Society in 1687. He married Costanza Gioannetti and had three daughters and a son, Giuseppe Ferdinando, who became his biographer. In 1690 he was appointed professor of mathematics at the University of Bologna and in 1694 professor of Hydrometry.

In 1698 he was invited by the prestigious University of Padua to teach mathematics, astronomy and medicine and to collaborate in the restoration of the fortifications of Kotor in Dalmatia (today Montenegro).

He died in 1709 after eight months of agony for a cerebral haemorrhage. He was buried in the church of St. Massimo in Padua and a sumptuous monument was erected in the Basilica of Saint Anthony of Padua.

== Works ==
- Domenico Guglielmini, Dominici Gulielmini ... Opera omnia mathematica, hydraulica, medica, et physica. Accessit vita autoris, a Jo. Baptista Morgagni ... cum figuris & indicibus necessariis, Tomus primus, Tomus secundus, Genevae : sumptibus Cramer, Perachon & socii, 1719

=== Hydraulics ===
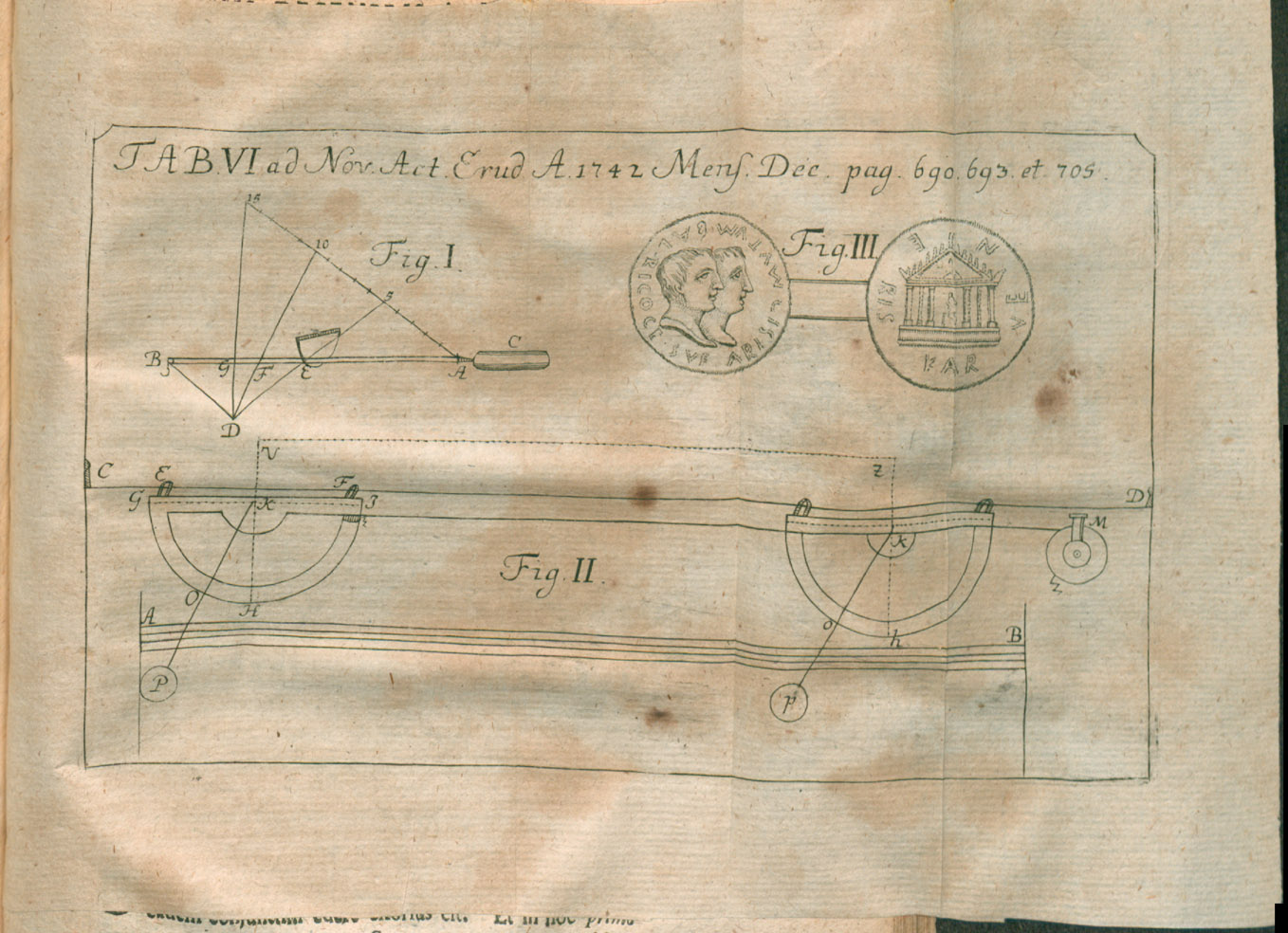
Fig. 1. Illustration to the review about Natura dei fiumi, published on Acta Eruditorum in 1742

- Domenico Guglielmini (1690–1691). Aquarum fluentium mensura. Bologna: ex Typographia Pisariana.
- Domenico Guglielmini, Dominici Gulielmini medici et mathematici Boniensis Epistolae duae hydrostaticae altera apologetica aduersus obseruationes contra mens. aquarum fluentium a clarissimo viro Dionisio Papino factas...altera de velocitate, & motu fluidorum in siphonibus recuruis suctorijs, Bononiae : apud h.h. Antonij Pisarij, 1692.
- Domenico Guglielmini (1697). Della natura de' fiumi, trattato fisico-matematico. Bologna: per gl'eredi d'Antonio Pisarri, a spese di Ludouico Maria Ruinetti libraro al Mercurio.
- Della natura de' fiumi trattato fisico-matematico del dott. Domenico Guglielmini. - Nuova edizione con le annotazioni di Eustachio Manfredi. ... - In Bologna : nella stamperìa di Lelio dalla Volpe, 1739.
- Domenico Guglielmini, Risposta al parere de' molto reverendi padri Seur e Jacquier sopra i diversi progetti per il regolamento delle acque delle tre provincie di Bologna Ferrara e Romagna, In Firenze : appresso Andrea Bonducci, 1765.

=== Chemistry and crystallography ===
- Domenico Guglielmini, Riflessioni filosofiche dedotte dalle figure de' sali dal dottore Domenico Guglielmini espresse in vn discorso recitato nell'Accademia filosofica esperimentale di monsig. arcidiacono Marsigli la sera delli 21. marzo 1688, In Bologna : per gli eredi d'Antonio Pisarri, 1688.
- Domenico Guglielmini (1705). De salibus dissertatio epistolaris physico-medico-mechanica. Venetiis: apud Aloysium Pavinum.
- Domenico Guglielmini, De salibus dissertatio epistolaris physico-medico-mechanica conscripta a Dominico Guglielmini philosopho et medico Bononiensi, Lugduni Batavorum : apud Fredericum Haaring, 1707.

=== Medicine ===
- Domenico Guglielmini, De sanguinis natura & constitutione exercitatio physico-medica Dominici Gulielmini, Venetiis : ex typographia Andreae Poleti, 1701.
- Domenico Guglielmini, Dominici Guglielmini ... Exercitatio de idearum vitiis correctione & usu ad statuendam & inquirendam morborum naturam, Patavii : apud Josephum Corona, 1707.
- Domenico Guglielmini, Dominici Guglielmini ... Commentaria in primam Aphorismorum Hippocratis sectionem, a Josepho Ferdinando filio, nonnullis explicationibus locupletata & deficientium aucta. Praemittuntur praelectiones tres in idem argumento ab eodem Dominico, Bononiae: apud Thomam Colli ex typographia S. Thomae Aquinatis, 1748.

=== Physics and astronomy ===
- Domenico Guglielmini (1677). Propositiones geographico-astronomico-geometrico-opticae. Bononiae: ex typographia Manoiessiana.
- Domenico Guglielmini, De cometarum natura et ortu epistolica dissertatio occasione nouissimi cometae sub finem superioris anni; & inter initia currentis obseruati conscripta. Auctore Dominico Gulielmino, Bononiae : typis haeredis Dominici Barberij, 1681.
- Domenico Guglielmini, Pro theoria medica aduersus empiricam sectam praeletio habita Patavij die 2. Maij 1702. A Domenico Guglielmini bononiensi. Dum a mathematicarum scientiarum cathedra ad primam theoreticae medicinae transitum faceret, Venetiis : typis Hieronymi Albriccij, 1702.
- Domenico Guglielmini, Dominici Guglielmini ... De principio sulphureo dissertationes quibus mantissae loco accessit dissertatio de aethere, Venetiis : apud Andream Poleti, 1710.
- Domenico Guglielmini, Dominici Gulielmini ... Observatio solaris eclipsis anni 1684. Bononiae habita die 12. iulij eusdem anni, Patavij : typis Jo. Baptistae Conzatti, 1711.
- Domenico Guglielmini (1695). Meridiana del tempio di S. Petronio tirata e preparata per le osservazioni astronomiche l'anno 1655. In Bologna: per l'erede di Vittorio Benacci.

== See also ==
- Chemical crystallography before X-rays
- Geometrical crystallography before X-rays
