= Ludwig August Seeber =

German physicist

Ludwig August Seeber (14 November 1793 in Karlsruhe – 9 December 1855 in Karlsruhe) was a German mathematician and physicist.

== Life and work ==
Only little is known of Seeber's origin and education. In 1810, he studied astronomy at the University of Göttingen with Carl Friedrich Gauss, a companion of this time was Christian Ludwig Gerling. (Note: Gauss and Gerling mentioned Seeber several times in their correspondence.) From 1819 to 1822 he was teacher at the cadet school at Karlsruhe. He got his doctor degree in 1824 from the University of Freiburg, where he was professor ordinarius for physics until 1834 and three times Dean of the Philosophical Faculty in 1814, 1829, and 1834. From 1834 to 1840, he was professor of physics both at the Polytechnicum and the Lyceum in Karlsruhe. Seeber applied twice in 1830 and 1838 for a professorship in Göttingen, but without success. In 1840, he took early retirement.

Seeber is known for his mathematical studies with special regard to crystallography. He tried to find explanations for the changing properties of crystals, such as thermal expansion or elasticity, what was impossible with the current theory of the late 18th century created by René Just Haüy, that used a bricklike model of crystal structure. Seeber modernized Haüy's concept with introducing the idea of spherical particles (atoms or molecules) as basic components of the crystals, holding together in an equilibrium of attractive and repulsive forces.

Following Max von Laue, Seeber's "essentially modern" concept from 1824 "was the earliest application of the scientific atomic theory to a purely physical problem."

In his second work from 1831, Seeber continued the research on positive ternary quadratic forms Gauss had begun thirty years ago in his Disquisitiones Arithmeticae. Seeber derived criteria for equivalence or non-equivalence of the reduced forms for the determinant of ternary forms.

He derived two lemmas for the relation of determinants with the coefficients of the reduced forms, but could only prove one of them, the second one remained as a conjecture. Gauss was able to prove this very shortly on three pages of his unusually detailed review of Seeber's work.

Gauss claimed Seeber's work for its exemplary thoroughness and protected it against the possible reproach of "repulsive long-windedness". The reduction of ternary forms was later simplified by Gauss's successor Peter Gustav Lejeune Dirichlet (1847).

== Writings ==
- "Versuch einer Erklärung des inneren Baues der festen Körper". Annalen der Physik und der physikalischen Chemie (in German). 16: 229–248, 349–371. 1824.
- Seeber, Ludwig August (1831). Untersuchungen über die Eigenschaften der positiven ternaeren quadratischen Formen (in German). Mannheim.
- Ergänzung des Euklidischen Systems der Geometrie, in Rücksicht seiner ungenügenden Beweise der die Parallellinien und ihre Eigenschaften betreffenden Lehrsätze (in German). Karlsruhe: G. Braun'sche Hofbuchhandlung. 1840.

== See also ==
- Geometrical crystallography before X-rays
