= Moritz Anton Cappeller =

Swiss physician and naturalist (1685–1769)

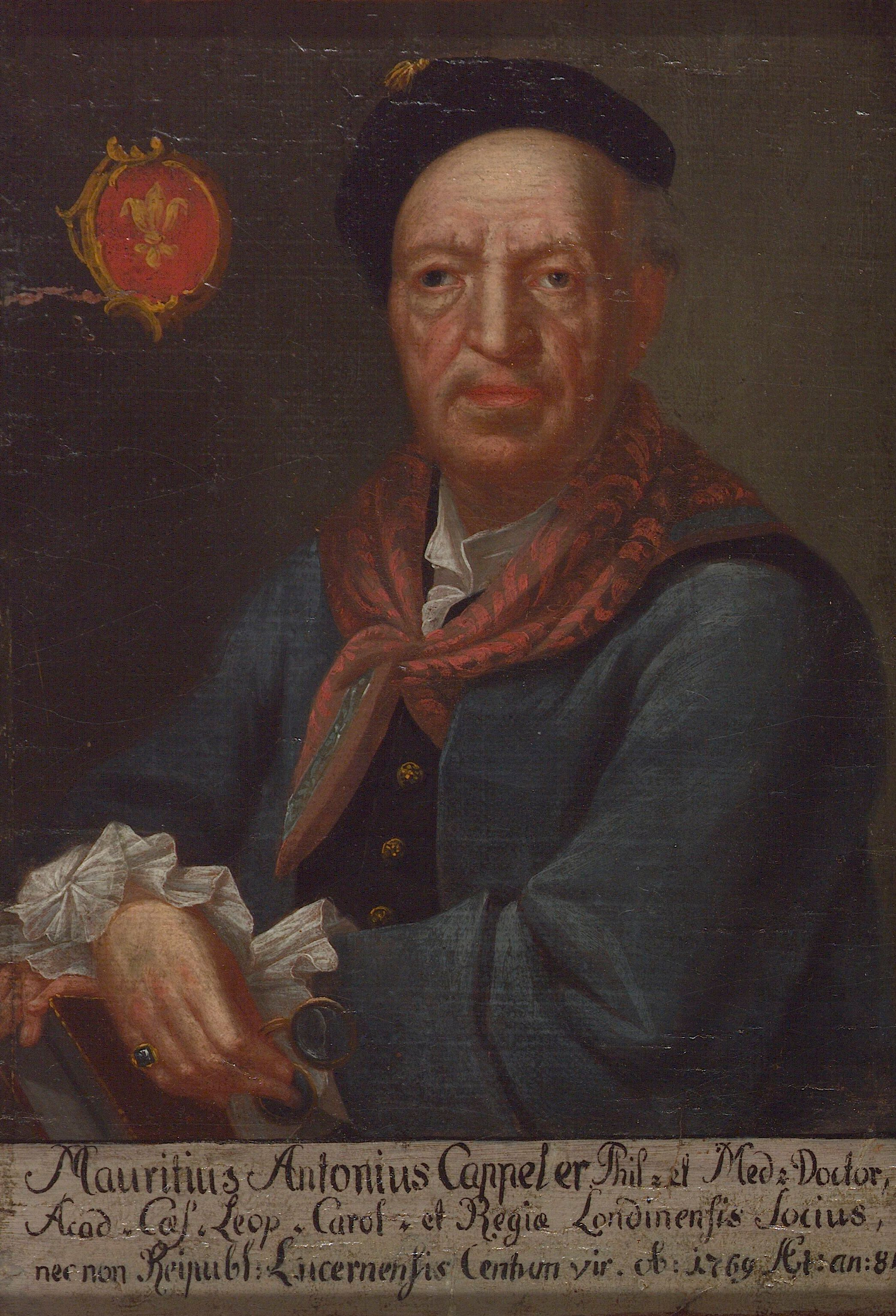
Moritz Anton Cappeller

Moritz Anton Cappeller (German: Moritz Anton Kappeler; 9 June 1685 – 16 September 1769), also known as Mauritius Antonius de Cappeller, was a Swiss physician and naturalist. His last name is also written in Anglicized forms as Capeller or Cappeler.

== Life and career ==
Cappeller was born in Willisau in 1685 and grew up in the city of Lucerne. After finishing Latin school, he graduated from the Jesuit College in Lucerne. From 1700 to 1704, he studied mathematics and philosophy at the Collegium Helveticum in Milan. He completed his medical studies at the Lorraine Academy (later University of Lorraine) in Pont-à-Mousson in 1706. During the War of the Spanish Succession, he served as a doctor and engineer in Naples. In addition to his work in the imperial service, he also had time for scientific observations. He climbed Mount Vesuvius twice and lay down on the edge of the crater. He later published his observations under the title: Curieuse Relation von dem feuerspeuchtenden Berg Vesuvio. He turned down an offer of a professorship in Naples.

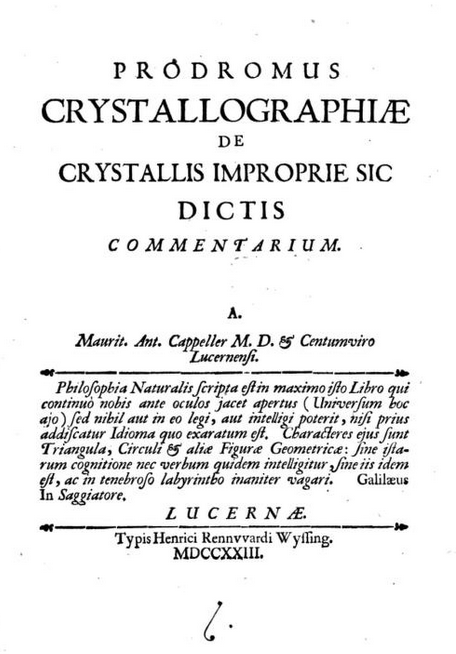
Front page of Prodromus Crystallographiae by Cappeller (1723)

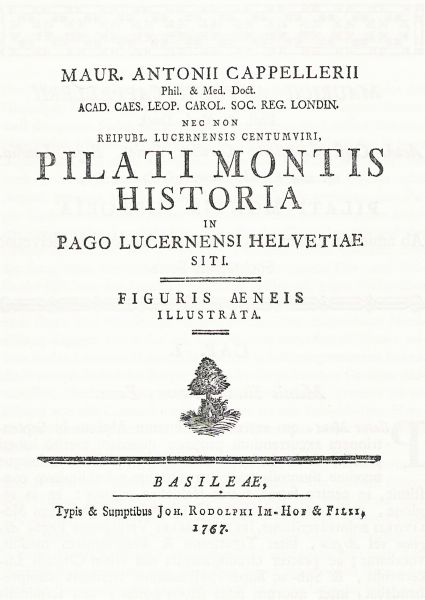
Front page of Pilatii montis historia by Cappeller (1767)

At his father's request, Cappeller returned to Lucerne in 1710, where he took over his father's medical practice. From 1712 to 1754 he was the town doctor in Lucerne. From 1717 on, he was a member of the Lucerne Grand Council. In addition to his bread-and-butter work as a doctor, he was repeatedly able to apply his knowledge as an engineer. For example, he accompanied the Lucerne troops in the Toggenburg War as an engineer. He was also a teacher of mathematics and geometry at the artillery school. He played a key role in correcting the white water of the Krienbach.

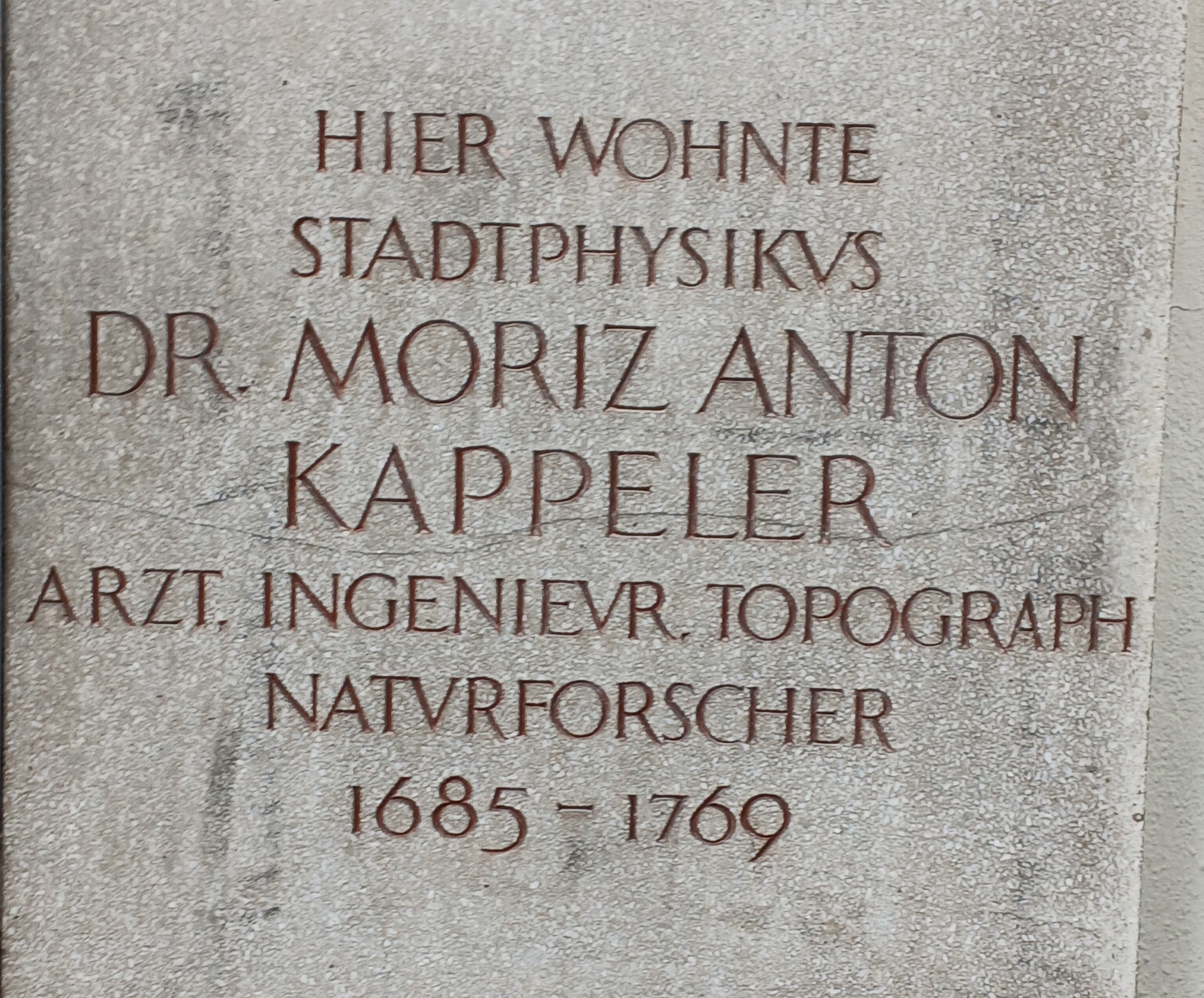
Commemorative plaque in Lucerne

He became famous for his crystallographic and mineralogical work. His publication Prodromus cristallographiae caused an international sensation and earned him membership of the Royal Society of London. His main work, the history of the Mount Pilatus (Pilatii montis historia), which he worked on from 1723 to 1728, did not initially find a publisher. For the first time, Cappeller produced a map of the mountain using only two perspectives drawn from different viewpoints. His research activities were varied; his interests included rock science, botany, crystallography and surveying. He was also involved in a wide network of correspondents. He corresponded with Johann Jakob Scheuchzer, Albrecht von Haller, Abraham Gagnebin, Isaak Iselin, Josef Anton Felix Balthasar, the nuncio Domenico Silvio Passionei, but also with members of the Royal Society (including Hans Sloane, to whom he also sent some minerals).

In 1730, Cappeller was elected a member of the German National Academy of Sciences Leopoldina with the academic surname Archyta Tarentinus I. After the death of his wife, Cappeller moved to his son in Ruswil in 1754 and, when he became a canon, to Beromünster. He died on 19 September 1769, and was buried in the cloister of the canons' monastery in Beromünster.
