= Moritz Ludwig Frankenheim =

German physicist (1801–1869)

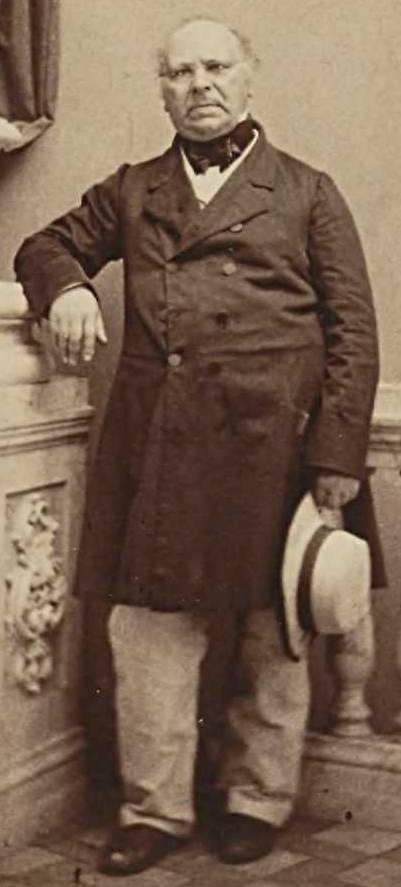
- Born: 29 June 1801; Brunswick, Principality of Brunswick-Wolfenbüttel
- Died: 14 January 1869 (aged 67); Dresden, Kingdom of Saxony
- Education: Humboldt University of Berlin
- Known for: Work on crystallography, particularly studies of crystal structure and the mathematical and theoretical basis of the symmetry of crystals
- Spouse: Friderike Frankenheim
- Children: 2 daughters
- Scientific career
- Fields: Physics, geography, crystallography
- Workplaces: University of Breslau
- Thesis: Dissertatio de Theoria Gasorum et Vaporum Meditationes ("Contemplations on the scientific theory of gases and vapors") (1823)

Moritz Ludwig Frankenheim (29 June 1801 – 14 January 1869) was a German physicist, geographer, and crystallographer.

== Life and education ==
Moritz Ludwig Frankenheim was born in 1801 in Brunswick. His family was Jewish. He attended the Gymnasium (high school) there and in Wolfenbüttel. Afterwards he went to Berlin to attend the Alma Mater Berolinensis (today Humboldt University of Berlin) to study physics. In 1823 he completed a dissertation titled Dissertatio de Theoria Gasorum et Vaporum Meditationes ("Contemplations on the scientific theory of gases and vapors"). Inspired by the research of his teacher Christian Samuel Weiss (1780-1856), he became interested in crystallography. In 1827 he moved to the University of Breslau, where he was assistant professor of physics, geography, and mathematics from 1827 to 1850. In 1850 he was promoted to the position of professor of these subjects. After his retirement, he first moved to Leipzig and then to Dresden, where he died in 1869 at the age of 67.

== Work ==
Frankenheim's focus of research was crystallography, particularly studies of crystal structure and the mathematical and theoretical basis of the symmetry of crystals. By 1826, he was already using the integer reciprocals of Weiss' coefficients (the intersection of a plane with the three crystallographic axes) to describe the spatial positions of crystal surfaces, from which the British crystallographer William Hallowes Miller (1801-1880) developed the concept of Miller indices in 1839.

By assigning symmetry elements to the crystal systems defined previously by Weiss and Friedrich Mohs (1773-1839), Frankenheim was able, for the first time, to define 32 point groups (crystal classes) and to classify them into four crystal systems (the regular one, the fourfold, the twofold and the sixfold). He published this result in his 1826 paper "Crystallonomische Aufsätze".

Later, Frankenheim derived 15 lattice types for crystals, which were later reduced by Auguste Bravais (1811-1863) to 14 and today are referred to as Bravais lattices. On pages 311-312 of his 1835 book Die Lehre von der Cohäsion, Frankenheim says that application of symmetry ideas shows that there are 15 crystal families, but in this book he doesn’t actually describe them. On page 15 of his 1842 treatise System Der Krystalle, however, he says – in reference to what he calls the Grundform (basic shape) of crystals – that “there are a total of fifteen, three of which are tesseral (i.e., cubic) crystals, two are tetragonal, two are hexagonal, four are isoclinic (i.e., orthorhombic), three belong to monoclinic and one to triclinic crystals.” All these are the correct numbers except the three for monoclinic, which should be two. Later, on page 102, he discusses monoclinic crystals in more detail. Frankenheim’s three monoclinic shapes correspond to what we today call primitive, body-centered, and end-centered monoclinic unit cells. The primitive cell describes the primitive monoclinic lattice, but the body-centered and end-centered monoclinic cells describe the same non-primitive lattice: the two different cells can be transformed into one another by a simple redefinition of one of the cell axes. Bravais got the number right (14) in a paper he read to the French Academy of Sciences in 1848 (published in 1850) and also gave a good discussion of why there are exactly 14 lattices. For these reasons we refer to them today as Bravais lattices. Bravais mentions in a footnote that Frankenheim in his 1842 treatise listed 3 “modes of the oblique prismatic system of Hauy” (i.e., monoclinic crystals). Bravais goes on to say in the footnote that the last two of Frankenheim’s three modes are in fact identical. Interestingly, in 1856 Frankenheim revisited the question in a journal article (“Über die Anordnung der Moleküle im Krystall,” Ann. Phys. Chem. 1856, 97, 337–382. On page 349 he explicitly says that there are only two monoclinic lattices, not three, because the body-centered and end-centered monoclinic possibilities are actually identical by redefining an axis. He says on pages 355-356 that owing to this identity there are 14 families, not 15 as he said in 1835 and 1842. Nowhere in the article does he mention Bravais, however, so possibly he was unaware of Bravais’s 1848 paper.

Frankenheim conducted one of the first microscopic examinations of crystals in polarized light, using the then-new Nicol prism as a polarizer.

In the field of geography, his most famous work is his book Völkerkunde ("Ethnology"), published in 1852.

== Publications ==
- Dissertatio de Theoria Gasorum et Vaporum Meditationes (Contemplations on the scientific theory of gases and vapors), Berlin 1823.
- Crystallonomische Aufsätze (Essays on crystallography), ISIS, Vol. 19, pp. 497–515, 542–565, Jena 1826.
- Populäre Astronomie (Popular Astronomy), Brunswick 1827.
- De Crystallorum Cohäsione (Cohesion of crystals), Breslau 1829.
- Die Lehre von der Cohäsion, umfassend die Elasticität der Gase, die Elasticität und Cohärenz der flüssigen und festen Körper und die Krystallkunde (Theory of cohesion, encompassing the elasticity of gases, the elasticity and coherence of liquids and solids, and crystallography), Breslau 1835.
- System der Krystalle (Crystal systems), Breslau 1842.
- Krystallisation und Amorphie (Crystallization and amorphicity), Breslau 1851.
- Völkerkunde (Ethnology), Breslau 1852.
- Ueber das Entstehen und das Wachsen der Krystalle nach mikroskopischen Beobachtungen (On microscopic observations of the emergence and growth of crystals), 1860.
- Zur Krystallkunde. I. Characteristiken der Krystalle. (On crystal structure. I. Characteristics of crystals.), Leipzig 1869.

== See also ==
- Chemical crystallography before X-rays
- Geometrical crystallography before X-rays
