= Arnould Carangeot =

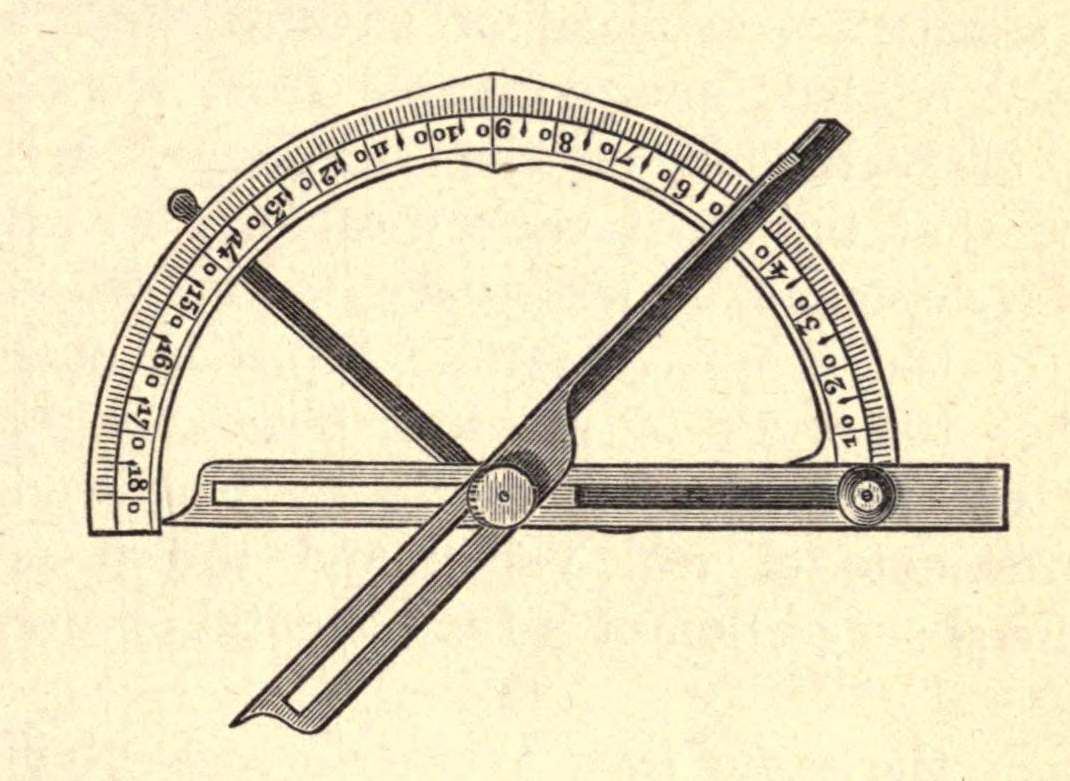
A Carangeot contact goniometer

Arnould Carangeot (12 March 1742 – 16 December 1806) was a French naturalist and mineralogist who invented one of the first goniometers for measuring the angles of the faces of crystals. Through its use came about the first ideas in crystallography on the constancy of the dihedral angles and symmetry of crystals of specific chemicals.

As an assistant to Jean-Baptiste Romé de L'Isle he examined crystals to make clay models and invented the goniometer in 1780. This led to Romé de L'Isle establishing the law of constancy of interfacial angles, a slight advance over Steno's idea that the interfacial angles were constant for a given substance.

He also contributed to a work on the butterflies of Europe.
