= George Szpiro =

Israeli-Swiss writer and mathematician

George Geza Szpiro (Hebrew: ג'ורג' גזה שפירא; born 18 February 1950 in Vienna) is an Israeli–Swiss author, journalist, and mathematician. He has written articles and books on popular mathematics and related topics.

== Life and career ==
Szpiro was born in Vienna in 1950, and moved to Zug, Switzerland, in 1961. He obtained a master's degree in mathematics and physics from ETH Zurich. He also obtained an MBA from Stanford University, in 1975. Afterward, he worked as a management consultant at McKinsey & Company. In 1984, he obtained a Ph.D. in mathematical economics from Hebrew University.

Szpiro was an assistant professor at the Wharton School of the University of Pennsylvania, during 1984–1986. He was a lecturer in mathematical economics at Hebrew University, during 1986–1992. He also taught at the University of Zurich. He has published research papers related to mathematics, finance, and statistics.

Since 1986, Szpiro has worked as a journalist at Neue Zürcher Zeitung. At NZZ, he has been the Israel correspondent and mathematics columnist. For his mathematics columns, Szpiro was awarded the Prix Média by the Swiss Academy of Natural Sciences, in 2003. He was also awarded the Media Prize by the German Mathematical Society, in 2006. Beside writing for NZZ, he has also written non-research mathematics columns for journals such as Nature and Notices of the American Mathematical Society.

== Books ==
- Kepler's Conjecture: How Some of the Greatest Minds in History Helped Solve One of the Oldest Math Problems in the World (John Wiley & Sons, 2003)
- The Secret Life of Numbers: 50 Easy Pieces on How Mathematicians Work and Think (Joseph Henry Press, 2006)
- Poincaré's Prize: The Hundred-Year Quest to Solve One of Math's Greatest Puzzles (Dutton, 2007)
- Numbers Rule: The Vexing Mathematics of Democracy, from Plato to the Present (Princeton University Press, 2010)
- A Mathematical Medley: Fifty Easy Pieces on Mathematics (American Mathematical Society, 2010)
- Pricing the Future: Finance, Physics, and the 300-year Journey to the Black-Scholes Equation (Basic Books, 2011)
