= History of crystallography before X-rays =

History of crystallography to 1895

Cleavage planes in a crystal of Iceland spar

The history of crystallography before X-rays describes how crystallography developed as a science up to the discovery of X-rays by Wilhelm Conrad Röntgen in 1895. The scientific approach to the study of crystals began in the 17th century with the work of Kepler on the structure of snowflakes and Nicolas Steno's discovery that the angles between corresponding faces in a crystalline substance are always the same. The work René Just Haüy published in 1801 and 1802 marked the point where crystallography split from mineralogy to become a science of its own. Some sources state that the history of crystallography started with the investigation of X-ray diffraction by Max von Laue in 1912 but that ignores over a century of previous scientific work in the field.

In the period before X-rays, crystallography can be divided into three broad areas: geometrical crystallography culminating in the discovery of the 230 space groups in 1891–4, physical crystallography, and chemical crystallography.

Up to 1912, crystallography had been largely based on mineralogy. It was the study of minerals in the 18th and 19th centuries that led to a progressive understanding of the relationships between chemical composition, crystal habit and crystal structure. During the 19th century crystallography was progressively transformed into an empirical and mathematical science by the adoption of symmetry concepts.

== Origins ==
=== 16th century ===
The scientific study of the properties of crystals began in the 16th century. In the first half of the 16th century Paracelsus proposed a theory of mineral formation as an analogy to fruit-bearing plants. In 1546 Georgius Agricola published a study of mineralogy in which morphology, or geometrical shape, was one of the characteristics used to classify minerals. In 1550 Gerolamo Cardano made an early attempt to explain the shape of crystals as the result of a close packing of spheres. In 1591 Thomas Harriot studied the close packing of cannonballs (spheres). In 1597 Andreas Libavius recognised the geometrical characteristics of crystals and identified salts by their crystal shape.

=== 17th century ===
In 1611 Johannes Kepler published Strena Seu de Nive Sexangula (A New Year's Gift of Hexagonal Snow) which is considered the first treatise on geometrical and atomistic crystallography. Kepler studied the packing of spheres, in order to explain the hexagonal symmetry of snow crystals. He demonstrated that in a compact packing each sphere has six neighbours in the same plane, three in the plane above, and three in the plane below, for a total of twelve touching spheres. Kepler concluded that 0.74084 is the maximum possible density amongst any arrangement of spheres — this became known as the Kepler conjecture. The conjecture was finally proved by Thomas Hales in 1998.

In 1665 Robert Hooke attempted to explain crystal morphology based on the stacking of atoms. In his work Micrographia he reported on the regularity of quartz crystals observed with the recently invented microscope, and proposed that they are formed by spherules.

Nicolas Steno rejected Paracelsus's proposed organic origin for crystals. Steno first observed the law of constancy of interfacial angles in 1669 when studying quartz crystals and noted that, although the crystals of a substance differed in appearance from one to another, the angles between corresponding faces were always the same. Steno's work can be considered as the beginning of crystallography as an independent discipline.

In 1678 Christiaan Huygens proposed a structural explanation of the double refraction of calcite based on ellipsoidal atoms. Huygens published his results in his Traité de la Lumière.

A geometrical theory of crystal structure based on polyhedra was proposed by Domenico Guglielmini. Guglielmini's publications of 1688 and 1705 concluded that basic forms (cube, rhombohedron, hexagonal prism, and octahedron) of various salt crystals are characteristic of each substance, are identical in form, indivisible, and have faces with identical inclinations to each other.

By the second half of the 17th century the ideas of Paracelsus had been displaced by a more scientific approach to chemistry, geology, mineralogy, and the emerging field of crystallography. In his book The Sceptical Chymist of 1661, Robert Boyle criticised the traditional composition of materials, as represented by the teaching of Aristotle and Paracelsus, and initiated the modern understanding of chemical elements using the words "perfectly unmingled bodies". Boyle argued that matter's basic elements consisted of various types of particles, termed "corpuscles", which were capable of arranging themselves into groups (molecules). Boyle was one of the earliest researchers to use the term crystal for crystalline substances apart from quartz.

== Geometrical crystallography ==
=== 18th century ===
In 1723 Moritz Anton Cappeller published Prodromus Crystallographiae, the first treatise on crystal shapes. The introduction of the term crystallography is attributed to Cappeller.

In 1773 Torbern Bergman, a leader in the field of chemical analysis, described the crystal forms of calcite and stated that all the forms could be built up from the cleavage rhombohedron. Bergman, building on the previous work of Carl Linnaeus, developed a classification of minerals based on chemical characteristics, with subclasses organised by their external shapes, and defined seven primary crystal forms. In 1774 Abraham Gottlob Werner published his classification of minerals. Werner postulated seven primary forms, and showed that some geometrical forms could be derived from one another by truncation.

With Jean-Baptiste L. Romé de l'Isle's Essai de cristallographie published in 1772 and Cristallographie published in 1783 the scientific approach to crystal structure began. Romé de l'Isle described over 500 crystal forms and accurately measured the interfacial angles of a great variety of crystals, using the goniometer designed by his student Arnould Carangeot. He noted that the angles are characteristic of a substance, thus generalising the law of constancy of angles postulated by Nicolas Steno. Romé de l'Isle considered that the shape of a crystal is a consequence of the packing of elemental particles, and defined six primitive forms. However, he criticised René Just Haüy and Torbern Bergman for speculating on the internal structure of crystals without sufficient observational data.

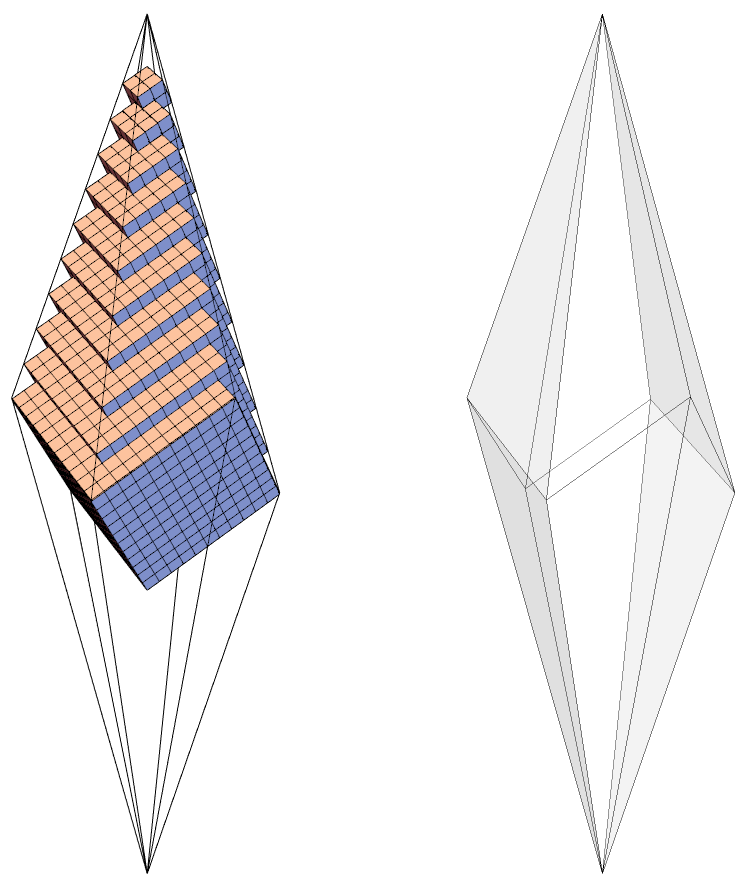
Calcite scalenohedron crystal constructed from small building blocks (molécules intégrantes) using the law of decrements of René Just Haüy.

In 1781 René Just Haüy (often termed the "Father of crystallography") discovered that crystals always cleave along crystallographic planes. Based on this observation, and the fact that the interfacial angles in each crystal species always have the same value, Haüy concluded that crystals must be periodic and composed of regularly arranged layers of tiny polyhedra (molécules intégrantes). This theory explained why all crystal planes are related by small rational numbers (the law of rational indices). In 1784 René-Just Haüy published his law of decrements: a crystal is composed of molecules arranged periodically in three dimensions without leaving any gaps. Haüy's molecular crystal structure theory assumed that molécules intégrantes were specific in shape and composition for every compound. Haüy developed his mathematical theory of crystal structure over many years. His theory turned out to be remarkably accurate, and gave crystallography a legitimate place among the sciences.

Haüy's crystal structure theory was criticised as over-simplistic by William Hyde Wollaston in 1813 and by Henry James Brooke in 1819. Haüy also tended to ignore experimental results that contradicted his structural theory, such as those achieved with the more accurate reflection goniometer invented by Wollaston in 1809. In 1819 Eilhard Mitscherlich discovered the law of isomorphism, which states that compounds which contain the same number of atoms, and have similar structures, tend to exhibit similar crystal forms. The discovery of the phenomena of isomorphism and polymorphism dealt a clear blow to Haüy's crystal structure theory.

=== Atomism versus Dynamism ===
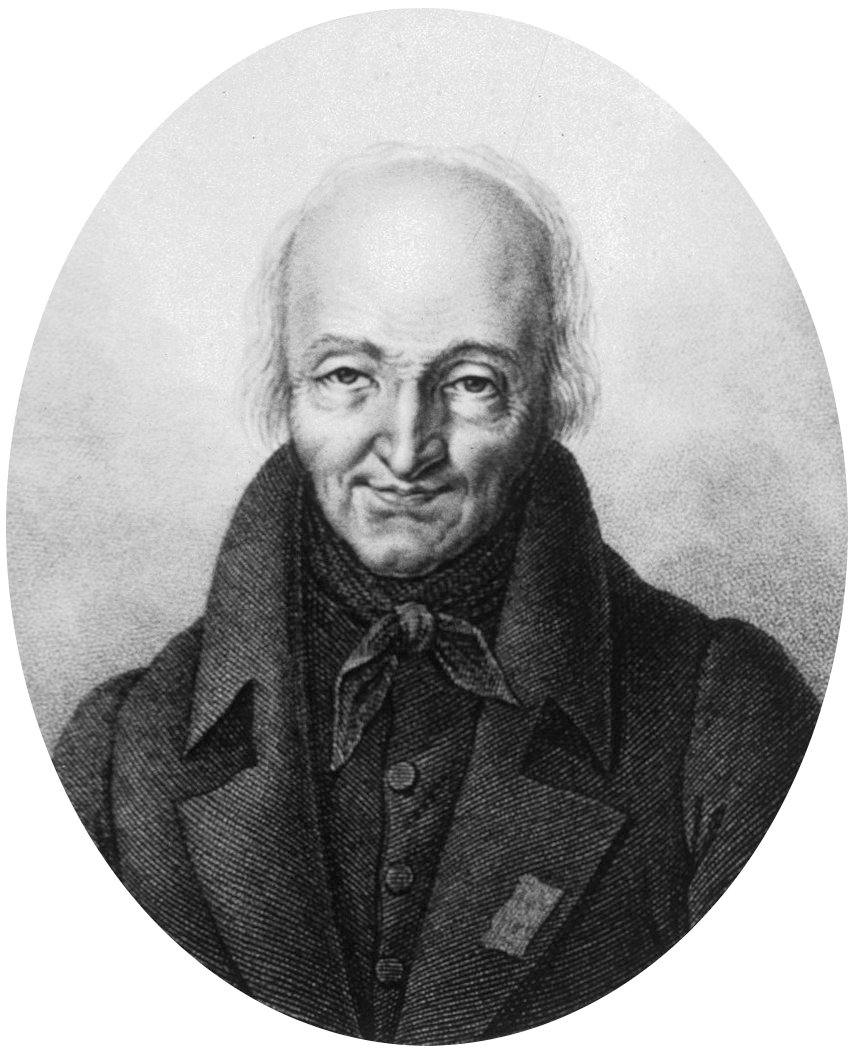
René Just Haüy

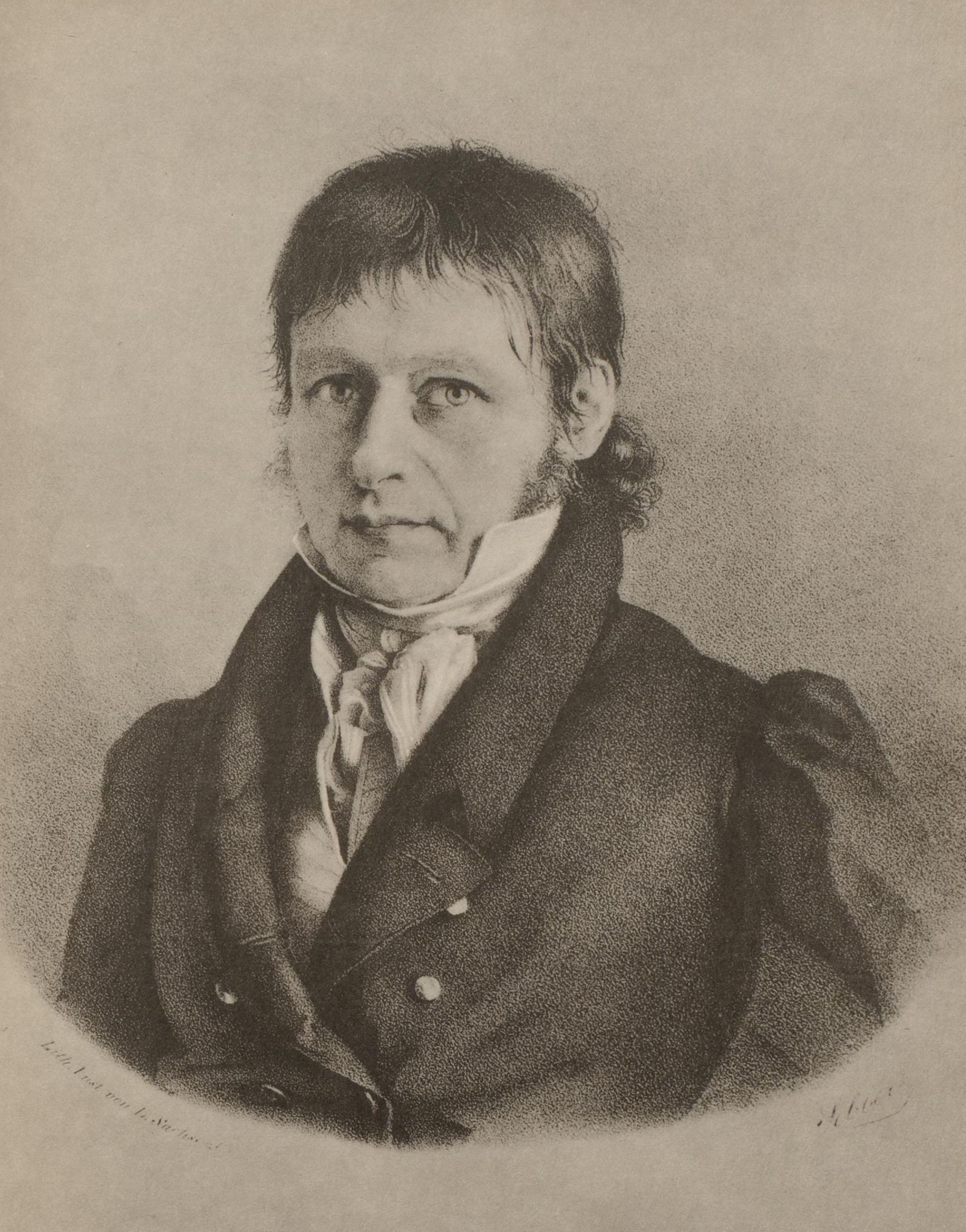
Christian Samuel Weiss

Leaders of the Atomistic (French) and Dynamic (German) Schools of Crystallography

Christian Samuel Weiss became familiar with Haüy's theory by translating his Traité de mineralogie (1801). In 1804 Weiss added an appendix to volume 1 of the translation in which he first outlined his dynamical theory of crystals. In contrast to Haüy, Weiss took a purely geometric approach to external crystal morphology, completely disregarding any attempt at modelling the internal structure of crystals. Weiss has been termed "the founder of geometric crystallography".

Weiss rejected Haüy's static "atomistic" theory of crystals instead using a "dynamic" approach that was typical of the German natural philosophers of the early 19th century. Weiss understood the external forms of crystals as a consequence of internal attractions and repulsions which could be observed as one or more axes of rotation. Weiss used crystallographic axes as the basis of his systematic classification of crystals.

Weiss and his followers Moritz Ludwig Frankenheim and Johann F. C. Hessel studied the symmetry of crystals. Up until 1800 the concept of symmetry had a variety of meanings, however during the 19th century crystallography was progressively transformed into an empirical and mathematical science by the adoption of symmetry concepts. By the second half of the 19th century the study of crystals was focused more on their geometry and mathematical analysis than their physical properties.

French scientists did not adopt the dynamic crystallographic theory, but they did attempt to learn from it. Gabriel Delafosse continued Haüy's work in France. He was the first to use the terms lattice (réseau) and unit cell (maille). He stated that the orientation of the axes in a substance is constant, which implies symmetry of translation (a defining feature of a lattice), and that the external symmetry of a crystal reflects its inner symmetry, namely the symmetry of the constituent atoms and their arrangement. In other words, the law of symmetry applies to both the inside and the outside of a crystal. Delafosse's approach explained the behaviour of hemihedral crystals, which were not adequately accounted for by Haüy.

=== Crystal systems ===
Christian Samuel Weiss introduced the concept of crystal systems in 1815. Weiss defined seven crystal systems: five based on three orthogonal axes (cubic, tetragonal, orthorhombic, monoclinic and triclinic), and two (trigonal and hexagonal) based on three axes in a plane at 60° to each other and a fourth axis orthogonal to the plane. The number and type of the crystal systems of Weiss correspond to the modern systems apart from the triclinic and monoclinic cases which have non-orthogonal axes.

Friedrich Mohs established a classification system for minerals based solely on their external shape. Mohs distinguished four crystal systems rather than the seven identified by Weiss. In 1824 Carl Friedrich Naumann confirmed Mohs' observation that the triclinic and monoclinic systems required inclined rather than orthogonal axes.

=== Crystal classes ===
In 1826 Moritz Ludwig Frankenheim published the first derivation of the 32 crystal classes, but his work was forgotten for many decades. In 1830, Johann Hessel proved that, as a consequence of the law of rational indices, morphological forms can combine to give exactly 32 kinds of crystal symmetry in Euclidean space, since only two-, three-, four-, and six-fold rotation axes can occur (the crystallographic restriction). However, Hessel's work remained practically unknown for over 60 years and, in 1867, Axel Gadolin independently rediscovered his results. Gadolin, who was unaware of the work of his predecessors, found the crystal classes using stereographic projection to represent the symmetry elements of the 32 groups. Gadolin's work had a clarity that attracted widespread attention, and caused Hessel's earlier work to be neglected.

=== Miller indices ===
The first to introduce indices to denote crystal planes was Christian Samuel Weiss. In 1823 Franz Ernst Neumann suggested that the inverse of the Weiss indices were simpler and easier to use. In 1825 William Whewell, independently from Neumann, proposed essentially the same indices.

William Hallowes Miller, a student of Whewell introduced the Miller indices in his book A Treatise on Crystallography (1839). The Miller indices are essentially the same as those of Neumann and Whewell. Miller's indices were accepted by his contemporaries because of their algebraic convenience, and it is his notation that is currently used in crystallography.

=== Bravais lattices ===
In 1835 Moritz Ludwig Frankenheim introduced the notion of lattice, independently of Ludwig August Seeber, and derived 15 lattice types; these correspond to the 14 Bravais lattices, but Frankenheim double-counted one of the monoclinic lattices.

In 1848 Auguste Bravais derived the 14 Bravais lattices. The work was published in 1850, and translated into English in 1949. Bravais's work can be considered as drawing on a combination of the approaches of Haüy and Weiss. Bravais constructed his mathematical lattices as finite sets of points in space, thus avoiding the need for the packing of spheres or polyhedra to represent physical atoms or molecules. He defined axes, planes and centres of inversion as symmetry elements, and identified all of their possible combinations. Bravais assumed that every atom or molecule in the lattice had the same orientation; in 1879 Leonhard Sohncke removed this restriction to derive his "Sohncke groups".

=== Space groups ===
The identification of the 230 space groups has been extensively documented and is now regarded as a major achievement of 19th century science. The space groups became important in the 20th century after the discovery of X-ray diffraction and the founding of the field of X-ray crystallography.

Ludwig August Seeber first put forward the concept of the space lattice in 1824. In 1879 Leonhard Sohncke combined the 14 Bravais lattices with the rotation axes and the screw axes to arrive at his 65 spatial arrangements of points in which chiral crystal structures form. Sohncke enumerated the space groups containing only the translations and rotations.

Rotoinversions and glide reflections were introduced by Evgraf Fedorov and Arthur Moritz Schoenflies to derive the 230 space groups. Fedorov and Schoenflies used different methods, but collaborated to reach the final list of space groups in 1891. William Barlow also derived the 230 space groups in 1894 using a method based on patterns of oriented motifs. Schoenflies' work was more influential than Fedorov's because he published his work in German rather than Russian, and Schoenflies' notation was more convenient and became widely adopted.

Progress towards the 230 space groups
Name	Year	Discovery
Christian Samuel Weiss	1815	7 crystal systems (using 2-, 3-, 4- and 6-fold rotation axes)
Ludwig August Seeber	1824	Concept of the space lattice
Moritz Ludwig Frankenheim	1835	15 lattice types (however one was double-counted)
Auguste Bravais	1848	14 space lattices (Bravais lattices) and 7 crystal systems
Leonhard Sohncke	1879	65 spatial arrangement of points (by adding rotation axes and screw axes to the 14 space lattices)
Evgraf Fedorov	1891	230 space groups (by adding rotoinversions and glide reflections)
Arthur Moritz Schoenflies	1891	230 space groups (using group theory)
William Barlow	1894	230 space groups (using patterns of oriented motifs)

The discovery of the space groups was not universally recognised as an important scientific breakthrough at the time, but after the invention of X-ray crystallography their physical significance was fully appreciated.

=== Crystal structure prediction ===
Until the use of X-rays there was no way to determine the actual crystal structure of even the simplest substances such as salt (NaCl). For example, in the 1880s, William Barlow proposed several crystal structures based on close-packing of spheres some of which were validated later by X-ray crystallography; however the available data were too scarce in the 1880s to accept his models as conclusive.

== Physical crystallography ==
Physical crystallography is concerned with the physical properties of crystals, such as their optical, electrical, magnetic, thermal, and mechanical properties. Unlike geometrical crystallography, the history of physical crystallography has no central story, but is a collection of developments in different areas.

=== Symmetry ===
During the 19th century physical crystallography was progressively transformed into an empirical and mathematical science by the adoption of symmetry concepts. In 1885 Woldemar Voigt formalized Neumann's principle as "if a crystal is invariant with respect to certain symmetry operations, any of its physical properties must also be invariant with respect to the same symmetry operations". Neumann's principle is sometimes referred to as the Neumann–Minnigerode–Curie principle based on later work by Bernhard Minnigerode and Pierre Curie. Curie's principle "the symmetries of the causes are to be found in the effects" is a generalisation of Neumann's principle. At the end of the 19th century Voigt introduced tensor calculus to model the physical properties of anisotropic crystals.

=== Interaction with electromagnetic radiation ===
==== Double refraction ====
In 1810 Étienne-Louis Malus determined that natural light, when reflected through a certain angle, behaves like one of the rays exiting a double-refracting crystal. Malus called this phenomenon polarization. In 1819 David Brewster found that all crystals could be classified as isotropic, uniaxial or biaxial. Augustin-Jean Fresnel published a paper on double refraction in 1827 in which he described light as a wave with field components in transverse polarization. Crystal optics was an active research area during the 19th century.

==== Rotary polarization ====
In 1811 François Arago, who favoured the corpuscular theory of light, discovered the rotation of the plane of polarization of light travelling through quartz. In 1812 Jean-Baptiste Biot, who favoured the wave theory of light discovered that while some crystals rotate the light to the right others rotate it to the left, and determined that the rotation is proportional to the thickness of substance traversed and to the wavelength of the light.

In 1821 John Herschel pointed out the relation between the direction of rotation and the development of faces on quartz crystals. Suspecting that rotatory polarization is an effect of a lack of symmetry, Herschel established that quartz crystals often present faces placed in such a way that those belonging to certain crystals are mirror images of the corresponding faces of other crystals. He explained the connection between this arrangement and the respective rotation of light to the right and to the left. In 1822 Augustin-Jean Fresnel explained the rotation by postulating oppositely circularly polarized beams travelling with different velocities along the optic axis. In 1846 Michael Faraday discovered that the plane of polarization may also be rotated when light passes through an isotropic medium in a magnetic field.

In 1848 Louis Pasteur gave the general relation between crystal morphology and rotatory polarization. Pasteur discovered the phenomenon of molecular asymmetry, that is that molecules could be chiral and exist as a pair of enantiomers. Pasteur's method was to physically separate the crystals of a racemic mixture of sodium ammonium tartrate into right- and left-handed crystals, and then dissolve them to make two separate solutions which rotated polarized light in opposite directions.

==== Conical refraction ====
Conical refraction is an optical phenomenon in which a ray of light, passing through a biaxial crystal along certain directions, is refracted into a hollow cone of light. There are two possible conical refractions, one internal and one external. In 1821–1822 Augustin-Jean Fresnel developed a theory of double refraction in both uniaxial and biaxial crystals. Fresnel derived the equation for the wavevector surface in 1823, and André-Marie Ampère rederived it in 1828.

William Rowan Hamilton discovered the wavevector surface has four conoidal points and four tangent conics. This implies that, under certain conditions, a ray of light could be refracted into a cone of light within the crystal. He termed this phenomenon "conical refraction" and predicted two distinct types: internal and external. Hamilton announced his discovery on 22 October 1832. He then asked Humphrey Lloyd to prove his theory experimentally. Lloyd first observed conical refraction on 14 December 1832 with a specimen of aragonite, and published his results in early 1833.

Hamilton and Lloyd's discovery was a significant victory for the wave theory of light and solidified Fresnel's theory of double refraction. The discovery of conical refraction is an example of a mathematical prediction being subsequently verified by experiment.

==== Absorption and pleochroism ====
In 1809 Louis Cordier discovered the phenomenon of pleochroism while investigating a new mineral that he named dichröıte (cordierite), whereby its crystals showed different colours when viewed along different axes. From 1817 to 1819 David Brewster made a systematic study of light absorption and pleochroism in various minerals and showed that, in uniaxial crystals, the absorption is smallest in the direction of, and greatest at right angles to, the optical axis. In 1838 Jacques Babinet discovered that the greatest absorption in a crystal generally coincided with the direction of greatest refractive index. In 1906 Friedrich Pockels published his Lehrbuch der Kristalloptik which gave an overview of the subject.

==== Luminescence ====
Luminescence is the non-thermal emission of visible light by a substance; an example is the emission of visible light by minerals in response to irradiation by ultraviolet light. The term luminescence was first used by Eilhard Wiedemann in 1888; he stated that luminescence was separate from thermal radiation, and he distinguished six different forms of luminescence according to their excitation.

Fluorescence is luminescence which occurs during the irradiation of a substance by electromagnetic radiation; fluorescent materials stop emitting light nearly immediately after the irradiation is halted, except in the case of certain materials exhibiting delayed fluorescence (e.g., TADF, TTA). The term fluorescence was coined by George Stokes in 1852, and was derived from the behaviour of fluorite when exposed to ultraviolet light.

Phosphorescence is long-lived luminescence; phosphorescent materials continue to emit light for some time after the radiation stops. In 1857 Edmond Becquerel invented the phosphoroscope, and in a detailed study of phosphorescence and fluorescence, showed that the duration of phosphorescence varies by substance, and that phosphorescence in solids is due to the presence of finely dispersed foreign substances.

Some additional kinds of luminescence from crystals can arise from energy sources other than electromagnetic radiation.

=== Effect of electricity and magnetism ===
==== Electrical conduction ====
The first observations on the variation of electrical conductivity with direction in a crystal (anisotropy) were made by Henri Hureau de Sénarmont in 1850 on 36 different substances. The results showed a correlation between the axes of symmetry and the directions of maximum or minimum conductivity.

==== Magnetic properties ====
Until the 19th century crystals were regarded either as magnetic or non-magnetic. Magnetic crystals are now called ferromagnetic to distinguish them from the several other kinds which have since been discovered. Siméon Denis Poisson (1826) put forward a theory of magnetism as applied to crystals and predicted the behaviour of crystals in a magnetic field which was verified by Julius Plücker in 1847. Plücker studied various natural crystals, such as quartz and related the reaction of the crystal to a magnetic field to its symmetry. All these crystals were repelled from a strong field, unlike ferromagnetic crystals; they were termed diamagnetic. In 1850 a number of investigations were carried out by Plücker and August Beer using torsion balances to measure the small forces involved in most observations. Not only were some crystals repelled from a strong field but others were slightly attracted. These were called paramagnetic. Between 1850 and 1856 John Tyndall studied diamagnetism in crystals.

By the end of the 19th century the three types of crystal—ferromagnetic, diamagnetic and paramagnetic—were well established and theoretical studies had related diamagnetic and paramagnetic crystals to their crystal symmetry.

==== Dielectric properties ====
A dielectric is an electrical insulator that can be polarized by an applied electric field. In 1851 the first experiments on the behaviour of crystals in an electric field were carried out by Hermann Knoblauch in a manner similar to that used for the study of magnetic properties. The conductivity of the crystals, both over the surface and through the body of the crystal, made these experiments unreliable. In 1876 Elihu Root avoided some of these difficulties by employing a rapidly alternating field between parallel plates. A brief history on the theories of dielectrics in the 19th century has been written.

=== Effect of temperature change ===
==== Thermal expansion ====
In 1824 Eilhard Mitscherlich observed that the angle between the cleavage faces of calcite changed with the temperature of the crystal. Mitscherlich concluded that, on heating, calcite contracts (has a negative coefficient of thermal expansion) in a direction perpendicular to the trigonal axis while expanding (positive coefficient) along that axis. This implies that there is a cone of directions along which there is no thermal expansion. In 1864 Hippolyte Fizeau used an optical interference method to make measurements on many crystals. The measurements of the change of interfacial angle and the expansion of cut plates and bars were applied to crystals of all symmetries.

Crystals with less than cubic symmetry are anisotropic and will generally have different expansion coefficients in different directions. If the crystal symmetry is monoclinic or triclinic, even the angles between the axes are subject to thermal changes. In these cases the coefficient of thermal expansion is a symmetric tensor of second rank.

==== Thermal conduction ====
The first experiments on thermal conduction in crystals were carried out by Jean-Marie Duhamel in 1832. Henri Hureau de Sénarmont conducted experiments to determine if heat would move through crystals with directional dependence. He found that, for non-cubic crystals, the isothermal envelope surrounding a point source of heat in a crystal plate had an elliptical shape whose exact form depended on the orientation of the crystal. Sénarmont's results qualitatively established that thermal conductivity is directionally dependent (thermal anisotropy), with characteristic directions related to crystallographic axes. In 1848 Duhamel provided an analysis of Sénermont's findings.

George Gabriel Stokes and William Thomson provided mathematical theories to explain Sénarmont's observations. Stokes acknowledged the connection between the phenomena and the symmetry of the crystal, and showed that the number of constants of heat conductivity reduces from nine to six in the case of two planes of symmetry. The matrix of thermal conductivity components resulting from Stoke's derivation constituted a tensor.

==== Thermoelectricity ====
Thomas Johann Seebeck discovered the thermoelectric effect in 1821, although it has been claimed that Alessandro Volta should be given the priority. In 1850 Jöns Svanberg used bismuth and antimony crystals to demonstrate a directional variation of the thermoelectric effect. In 1854 William Thomson put forward a mechanical theory of thermoelectric currents in crystalline solids. In 1889 Theodor Liebisch analysed the dependence of the thermoelectric force on the crystallographic direction in anisotropic crystals.

==== Pyroelectricity ====
Pyroelectricity is the generation of a temporary voltage in a crystal when subjected to a temperature change. The appearance of electrostatic charges upon a change of temperature has been observed since ancient times. Haüy made detailed investigations of pyroelectricity; he detected pyroelectricity in calamine and showed that electricity in tourmaline was strongest at the poles of the crystal and became imperceptible at the middle. Haüy later showed that hemihedral crystals are electrified by temperature change while holohedral (symmetric) crystals are not.

Research into pyroelectricity became more quantitative in the 19th century. In 1824 David Brewster gave the effect the name it has today. In 1840 Gabriel Delafosse theorised that only molecules which are not symmetrical can be polarized electrically. Both William Thomson in 1878 and Woldemar Voigt in 1897 helped develop a theory for the processes behind pyroelectricity. A detailed history of pyroelectricity has been written by Sidney Lang; shorter histories have also been published.

=== Effect of mechanical force ===
==== Elasticity ====
Some minerals, for example mica, are highly elastic, springing back to their original shape after being bent. Others, for example talc, may be readily bent but do not return to their original form when released. In 1828 Cauchy showed that 36 independent constants were required to describe elasticity in crystals. William Thomson (1857) showed that the thermodynamic requirements of a reversible process require only 21 constants.

In the period 1874–1888 Woldemar Voigt was the leading researcher on the elasticity of crystals. Voigt showed that the number of elasticity constants reduces as more symmetry is introduced into the crystal. For a triclinic crystal, which is the most general case, 21 elasticity constants are required. For a monoclinic crystal there are 13 elasticity constants, for a rhombic crystal 9, for a hexagonal crystal 7, for a tetragonal crystal 6, and finally for a cubic crystal there are only 3.

==== Photoelasticity ====
Photoelasticity describes changes in the optical properties of a material under mechanical deformation. David Brewster detected the effect in crystals and showed that uniaxial crystals could be made biaxial. In 1822 Augustin-Jean Fresnel experimentally confirmed that the photoelastic effect was a stress-induced birefringence.

Franz Ernst Neumann investigated double refraction in stressed transparent bodies. In 1841 Neumann published his elastic equations, which describe, in differential form, the changes which polarized light experiences when travelling through a stressed body. The Neumann equations are the basis of all subsequent photoelasticity research.

The photoelastic effect was analysed by Friedrich Pockels, who also discovered the Pockels electro-optic effect (the production of birefringence of light on the application of an electric field). In 1889–1890 Pockels produced a phenomenological theory for both of these effects for all crystal classes.

==== Piezoelectricity ====
In 1880 Pierre and Jacques Curie discovered piezoelectricity (an electric charge that accumulates in response to applied mechanical stress) in quartz, tourmaline, and other crystals. The Curies, however, did not predict the converse piezoelectric effect (the internal generation of a mechanical strain resulting from an applied electric field). The converse effect was deduced by Gabriel Lippmann in 1881. The Curies immediately confirmed the existence of the effect, and went on to obtain quantitative proof of the complete reversibility of electro-elasto-mechanical deformations in piezoelectric crystals.

In 1890 Woldemar Voigt published a phenomenological theory of the piezoelectric effect based on the symmetry of crystals without centrosymmetry.

== Chemical crystallography ==
Up until 1800 neither crystallography nor chemistry were established sciences in the modern sense; as the 19th century progressed both sciences developed in parallel. In the 18th century chemistry was in a transitional period as it moved from the mystical and philosophical approach of the alchemists, to the experimental and logical approach of the scientific chemists such as Antoine Lavoisier, Humphry Davy and John Dalton.

=== Early 19th century ===
From the late 18th century it became apparent that a crystal of a substance was composed of units, whether thought of as atoms, ions, molecules, or polyhedra, in a regular spatial arrangement, termed its crystal structure.

The most notable early theory for crystal structures was that of René Just Haüy. In 1801 Haüy, published his Traité de Minéralogie In this work Haüy described how the law of rational indices establishes relationships between the orientations of the crystal faces, and explains that crystalline solids are formed by replicas of what would now be considered a unit cell. Haüy's theory called for fixed mineral species, fixed crystal morphology, and constant chemical composition. This was a mineralogical equivalent to the law of definite proportions in chemistry. In 1822 Haüy published Traité de Cristallographie an updated version of his work of 1801. Haüy postulated, "to each specific substance with a well defined chemical composition, capable of existence in a crystalline form, there corresponds a shape that is specific and characteristic of that substance."

In 1808 John Dalton published his atomic theory of matter in A New System of Chemical Philosophy. In Dalton's theory, there were four key assertions: "matter is made up of roughly spherical atoms, which were indivisible and indestructible; all atoms of a given element are identical in mass and properties; compounds are formed by a combination of two or more different kinds of atoms; and chemical reactions involve the rearrangement of atoms". Thomas Kuhn proposed Dalton's atomic theory as an example of a paradigm in which Dalton asserted that atoms can only combine in simple, whole-number ratios (law of multiple proportions). Under this new paradigm, any reaction which did not occur in fixed proportion could not be a chemical process.

There was a contradiction between the crystallographic and chemical paradigms. Haüy's theory asserted that crystals were composed of polyhedral units stacked up in three dimensions without gaps; Dalton's theory, by contrast, implied that crystals were constructed by a periodic arrangement of spherical atoms in space. Haüy's theory was generally accepted by his fellow mineralogists in the period 1801–1815 but then came under attack from the German dynamist school led by Christian Samuel Weiss. Weiss and his followers studied the external symmetry of crystals rather than their internal structure. In 1819, Weiss demonstrated the generality of the phenomenon of hemihedry, thus challenging Haüy's holohedral approach.

In 1813 William Hyde Wollaston adopted Dalton's ideas and proposed using sphere packing to model crystal structures. In 1822 John Herschel proposed a causal relationship between the handedness of quartz crystals and the direction of their optical rotation. In a paper published in 1830 Brewster attempted to relate the phenomenon of double refraction to the arrangement of the molecules in crystals. If a crystal has three axes at right angles to each other then, if they are equivalent, the crystal is isotropic, if two are equivalent and the third different, the crystal is uniaxial, and if all three are different, the crystal is biaxial.

=== Isomorphism ===
Originally, René Just Haüy considered that each chemical compound had a characteristic crystalline form. However, based on his 1808 work with aragonite and his earlier studies of calcite Haüy had to concede that substances with the same chemical composition but different molecular arrangements could have different crystalline forms.

In 1819 Eilhard Mitscherlich discovered the law of isomorphism which states that compounds which contain the same number of atoms, and have similar structures, tend to exhibit similar crystal forms. Mitscherlich carried out the first systematic research on the dependence of crystal forms on their chemical nature. The discovery of isomorphism was the first major step in chemical crystallography and Emil Wohlwill regarded Mitscherlich's work on isomorphism as a milestone in the history of the atomic-molecular theory. The discovery of the phenomena of isomorphism and polymorphism dealt a clear blow to Haüy's crystal structure theory.

Mitscherlich's findings were a central consideration of the atomic weight determinations in 1819 by Jöns Jacob Berzelius, a leading proponent of Dalton's atomic theory. Berzelius classified minerals by their chemical composition rather than by their crystal morphology, as was the established practice. Mitscherlich's research, together with the work of Alexis Thérèse Petit and Pierre-Louis Dulong that heat capacities of solids vary with temperature and inversely with atomic weight, led Berzelius to declare them as a positive confirmation of the atomic theory.

A contemporary historical review of the development of isomorphism in the 19th century was written by Andreas Artsruni.

=== Polymorphism ===
In crystallography, polymorphism is the phenomenon where a compound can crystallize into more than one crystal structure; in the case of elements the term allotropy is sometimes used.

Eilhard Mitscherlich discovered polymorphism in his studies of sodium phosphate and sulphur in 1821–3. In the 1830s the development of the microscope enhanced observations of polymorphism and aided Moritz Ludwig Frankenheim's studies. Frankenheim was able to demonstrate methods to induce crystal phase changes. Soon after, the more sophisticated polarized light microscope came into use, and it provided better visualization of crystalline phases allowing crystallographers to distinguish between different polymorphs. The hot stage was invented and fitted to a polarized light microscope by Otto Lehmann in about 1877. This invention helped crystallographers determine melting points and observe polymorphic transitions.

In 1870 Paul Groth defined morphotropy as the state of two crystals whose similar physical structure is due to similar chemical composition. Groth examined the change in symmetry of a crystal as a result of the replacement of a hydrogen atom by another univalent atom or radical. In 1897 Wilhelm Ostwald introduced Ostwald's rule, to describe the formation of polymorphs. The rule states that usually the less stable polymorph crystallizes first. Ostwald's rule is not a universal law but a common tendency observed in nature.

=== Molecular chirality ===
In 1811 François Arago constructed a polariscope and used it to discover that quartz crystals would rotate the plane of polarization of polarized light. Shortly after Jean-Baptiste Biot found a similar optical rotation effect for solutions and concluded that the effect was an inherent property of certain molecules. In 1830 Jöns Jacob Berzelius discovered that tartaric and racemic acids have the same chemical composition, and concluded that a difference in the arrangement of the atoms in the molecules creates compounds with different properties; in the same paper Berzelius suggested the term "isomerism" for the phenomenon.

In 1831 Mitscherlich studied the tartrates in order to determine the differences between the isomers tartaric acid and racemic acid. By 1832 Biot had discovered that tartaric acid from grape juice was dextrorotatory and that racemic acid was optically inactive. In 1844 Mitscherlich found that the solution of sodium ammonium tartrate was optically active, but that of sodium ammonium paratartrate was optically inactive. The work of Biot and Mitscherlich was the starting point for research by Louis Pasteur. Pasteur discovered the phenomenon of molecular asymmetry, that is that molecules could be chiral and exist as a pair of enantiomers. Pasteur's research was in part informed by considerations of molecular symmetry.

William Thomson (Lord Kelvin) introduced the word "chiral" in 1904 to describe handed figures. Objects that do not exhibit optical isomerism are said to be "achiral", that is their image in a plane mirror can be made congruent with itself. The term chirality has almost completely displaced the term "dissymmetry" which was used by Pasteur.

=== Liquid crystals ===
In 1888 Friedrich Reinitzer examined the properties of various derivatives of cholesterol. Previously, other researchers had observed distinct colour effects when cooling cholesterol derivatives just above the freezing point, but had not associated it with a new phenomenon. Reinitzer found that cholesteryl benzoate does not melt in the same way as most substances, but has two melting points. Reinitzer consulted Otto Lehmann and they exchanged letters and samples. Lehmann examined the intermediate cloudy fluid, and reported seeing crystallites. Reinitzer published his results on 3 May 1888.

Reinitzer discovered three important features of liquid crystals: the existence of two melting points, the reflection of circularly polarized light, and the ability to rotate the direction of polarized light. The research was continued by Lehmann who started a systematic study, first of cholesteryl benzoate, and then of related compounds which exhibited the double-melting phenomenon. He was able to make observations in polarized light, and his microscope was equipped with a hot stage (sample holder equipped with a heater) enabling high temperature observations. The intermediate cloudy phase clearly sustained flow, but other features convinced Lehmann that he was dealing with a solid. By the end of August 1889 he had published his results. Liquid crystals are now known to have one- or two-dimensional periodicity, with rod or layer symmetry respectively.

=== Late 19th century ===
From the 1830s Haüy's molecular crystal structure theory started to be combined with the atomic theory of the chemists to produce a view of a crystal as the regular arrangement of atoms or molecules in space. In 1849 Auguste Bravais related the symmetry of the crystal, considered as one of 14 space lattices, to that of its constituting molecules and formalized the reticular interpretation of hemihedry given by Gabriel Delafosse. In 1852 Delafosse attempted to relate the structure of the molecule to the external shape of the crystal.

Developments in chemistry in the 1850s and 1860s were largely independent of the mathematical and geometrical direction of crystallography in the period 1850–1895 which had little concern with the practicalities of atomic and molecular arrangement.

In 1874 Jacobus Henricus van 't Hoff and Joseph Le Bel independently proposed the tetrahedral arrangement of the atoms bound to carbon in organic molecules. Van't Hoff's theory validated and explained Pasteur's results with tartrate crystals, and was fundamental to the further development of stereochemistry.

Until the use of X-rays there was no way to determine the actual crystal structure of even the simplest substances such as salt (NaCl). In the period between the discovery of X-rays (1895) and X-ray diffraction (1912) William Barlow and William Jackson Pope developed the principles of packing, and showed how to deduce the structures of some simple compounds. William Johnson Sollas emphasised the importance of different atomic sizes in constructing simple crystals, and correctly concluded that the sodium and chlorine atoms in salt would be of different sizes.

In his preface to Andreas Fock's An introduction to chemical crystallography Pope summarised the state of chemical crystallography in 1895 as follows:

"Our knowledge of the physical and geometrical properties of crystals is now very complete, but their relations to chemical constitution and composition are as yet but little known."

After 1912 crystallography would develop dramatically with the widespread adoption of X-ray diffraction to determine crystal structures.

== Instrumentation ==
=== Goniometry ===
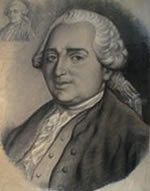
Jean-Baptiste L. Romé de l'Isle

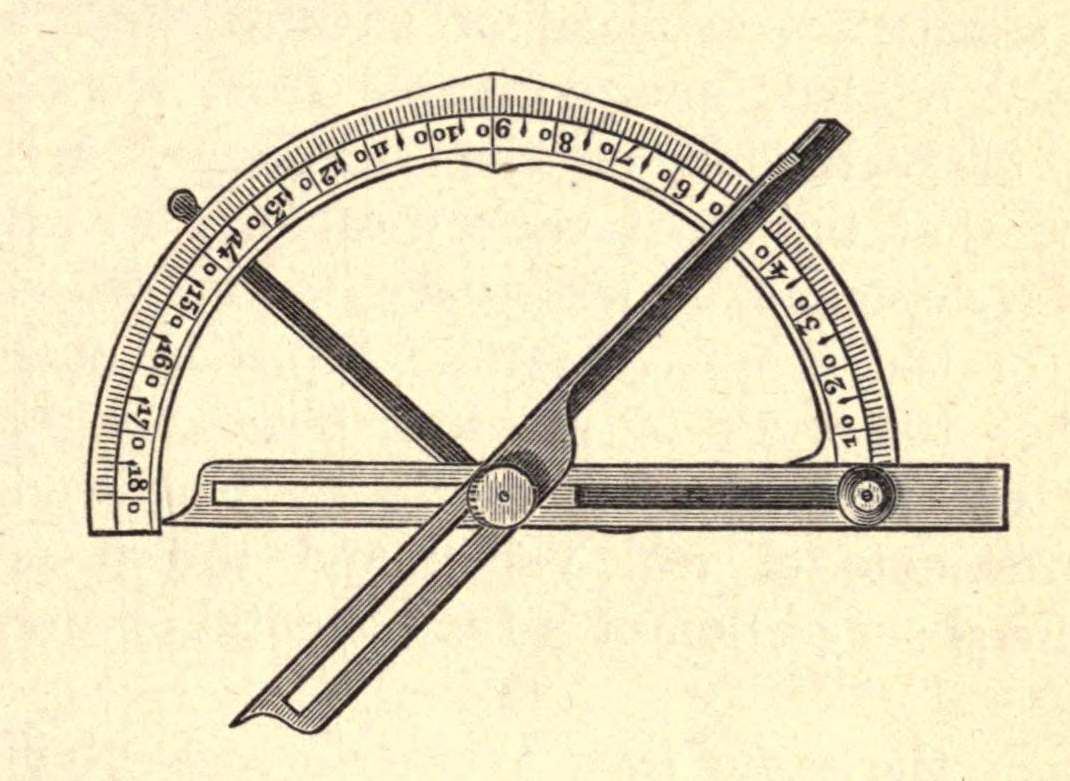
Contact goniometer of the Carangeot type

Romé de l'Isle (1783) used Carangeot's goniometer to establish the law of constancy of interfacial angles

Before the development of X-ray diffraction, the study of crystals was based on physical measurements of their geometry using a goniometer. This involved measuring the angles of crystal faces relative to each other and to crystallographic axes in order to establish the symmetry of the crystal.

Quantitative crystallography began with Arnould Carangeot’s invention of the contact goniometer in 1780, a handheld instrument with which the angles between the faces of a large crystal could be measured to an accuracy of, at best, a quarter of a degree (15′). Carangeot was a student of Jean-Baptiste L. Romé de l'Isle at the time of his invention of the basic crystallographic measuring instrument. Romé de l'Isle described over 500 crystal forms and accurately measured the interfacial angles of a great variety of crystals, using Carangeot's goniometer. Romé de l'Isle noted that the angles are characteristic of a substance, thus generalizing the law of constancy of interfacial angles postulated by Nicolas Steno in 1669.

Development of the goniometer 1780-1900
Year	Development	Inventor	Notes	Refs.
1780	Contact goniometer	Arnould Carangeot	Accuracy: 15′	
1809	One-circle reflection goniometer	William Hyde Wollaston	Accuracy: 5′	
1817	Goniometer with telescope	Étienne-Louis Malus	Accuracy: 1′	
1839	Horizontal circle goniometer	Jacques Babinet; Eilhard Mitscherlich	Accuracy: 30″	
1889	Two-circle reflection goniometer	Evgraf Fedorov	Description	
1893	Two-circle reflection goniometer	Victor Goldschmidt; Siegfried Czapski	Construction	

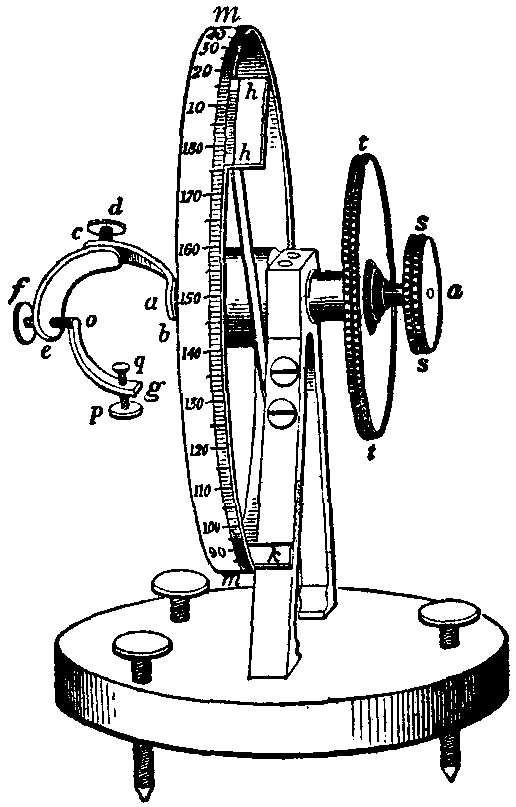
Wollaston goniometer

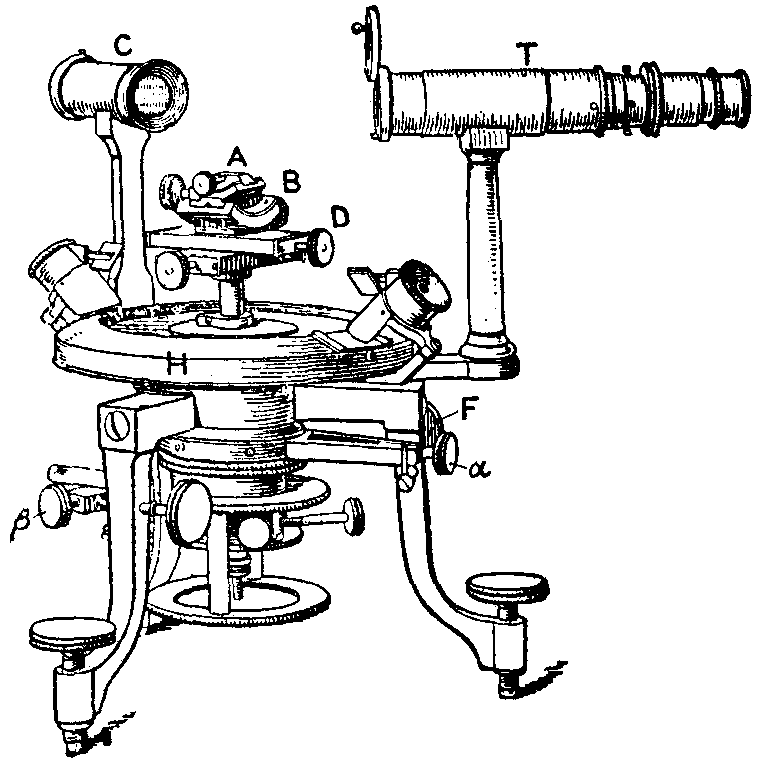
Horizontal circle goniometer

Reflecting and horizontal circle goniometers

William Hyde Wollaston invented the reflection goniometer in 1809. This instrument could be used with small crystals with an accuracy of one twelfth of a degree (5′) and was stated by John Herschel to have had a significant influence on the scientific development of mineralogy. The more precise angular measurements produced by the reflection goniometer challenged the crystal structure theory of René Just Haüy.

In 1817 Étienne-Louis Malus improved measuring conditions by introduced the first goniometer to incorporate a telescope. in 1839 Jacques Babinet's horizontal circle goniometer was the first to incorporate a collimator.

The invention of the two-circle reflection goniometer allowed a crystal to be rotated around two perpendicular axes. The advantage of this type of goniometer is that a crystal face could be brought into reflection without having to remount the crystal. Although there is some evidence that William Hallowes Miller invented a form of two-circle reflection goniometer in 1874, the credit is usually shared between Evgraf Fedorov who first described the invention in 1889, and Victor Goldschmidt and Siegfried Czapski who constructed two different models in 1893. In 1900 three-circle goniometers were designed but their high cost and complexity meant that they were not widely adopted.

=== Polarimetry ===
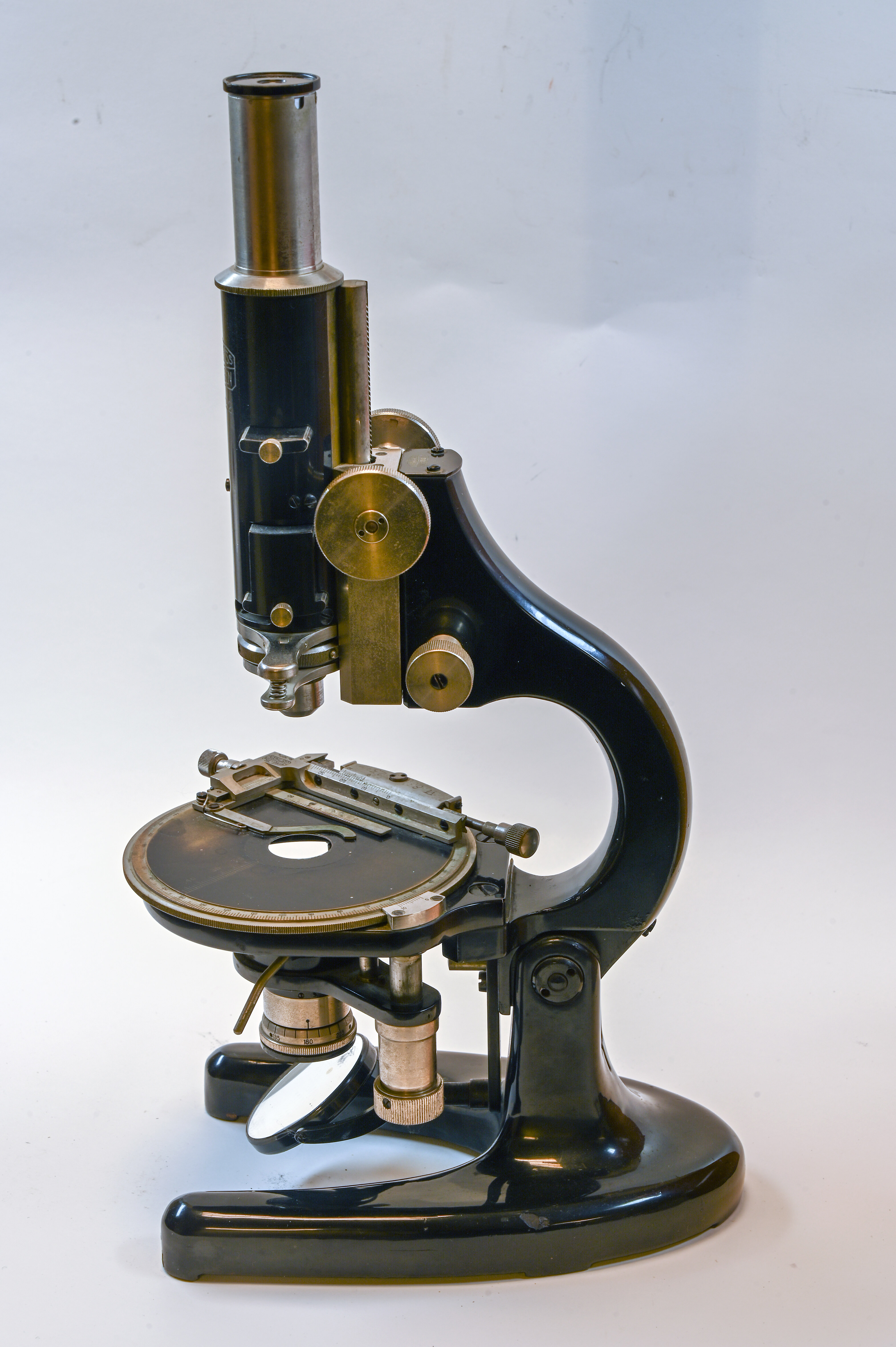
Polarizing microscope

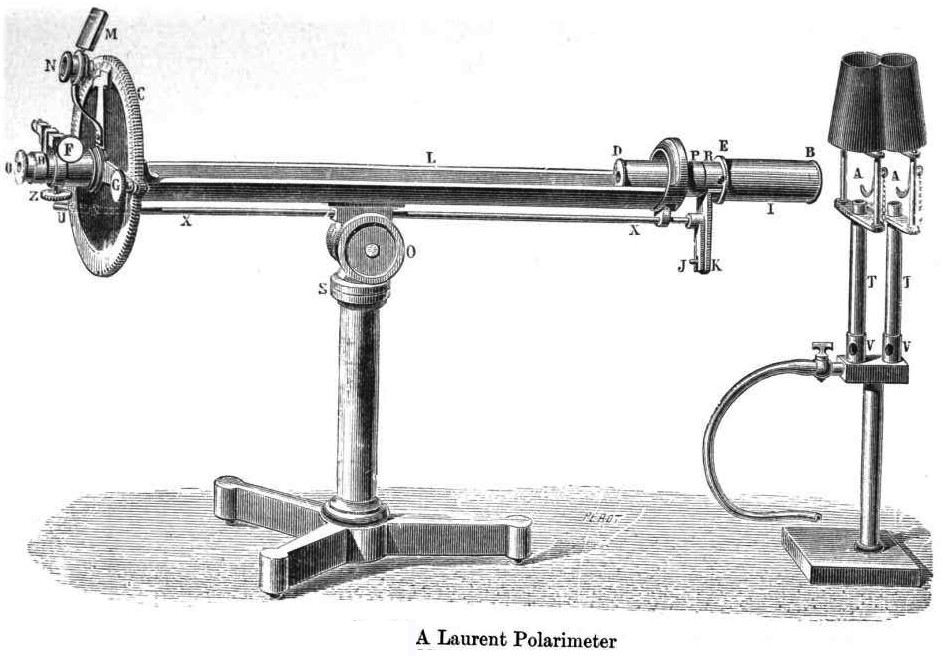
Polarimeter of the Léon Laurent type

Instruments for analyzing the polarization of crystals

In the 17th century optical microscopes were used by, amongst others, Robert Hooke, Antonie van Leeuwenhoek and Henry Baker to examine crystal morphology.

The instruments necessary for the study of the optical properties of crystals developed in parallel with the theoretical work. In 1809 Étienne-Louis Malus discovered that light becomes polarized when reflected by glass. Jean-Baptiste Biot was an early investigator of polarized light and produced a polarimeter (or polariscope) with a polarizer and an analyser but no lenses. In 1829 William Nicol described his polarizing prism. Giovanni Battista Amici devised a polarizing microscope around 1830 and in 1844 was probably the first to use lenses in conjunction with a polarizer and an analyser.

Compensators for the measurement of double refraction were introduced by David Brewster in 1830. The Amici-Bertrand lens was introduced by Émile Bertrand in 1878 based on Amici's original design of 1844. The universal stage for the polarizing microscope was introduced by Evgraf Fedorov in 1891.

=== Reflection from opaque materials ===
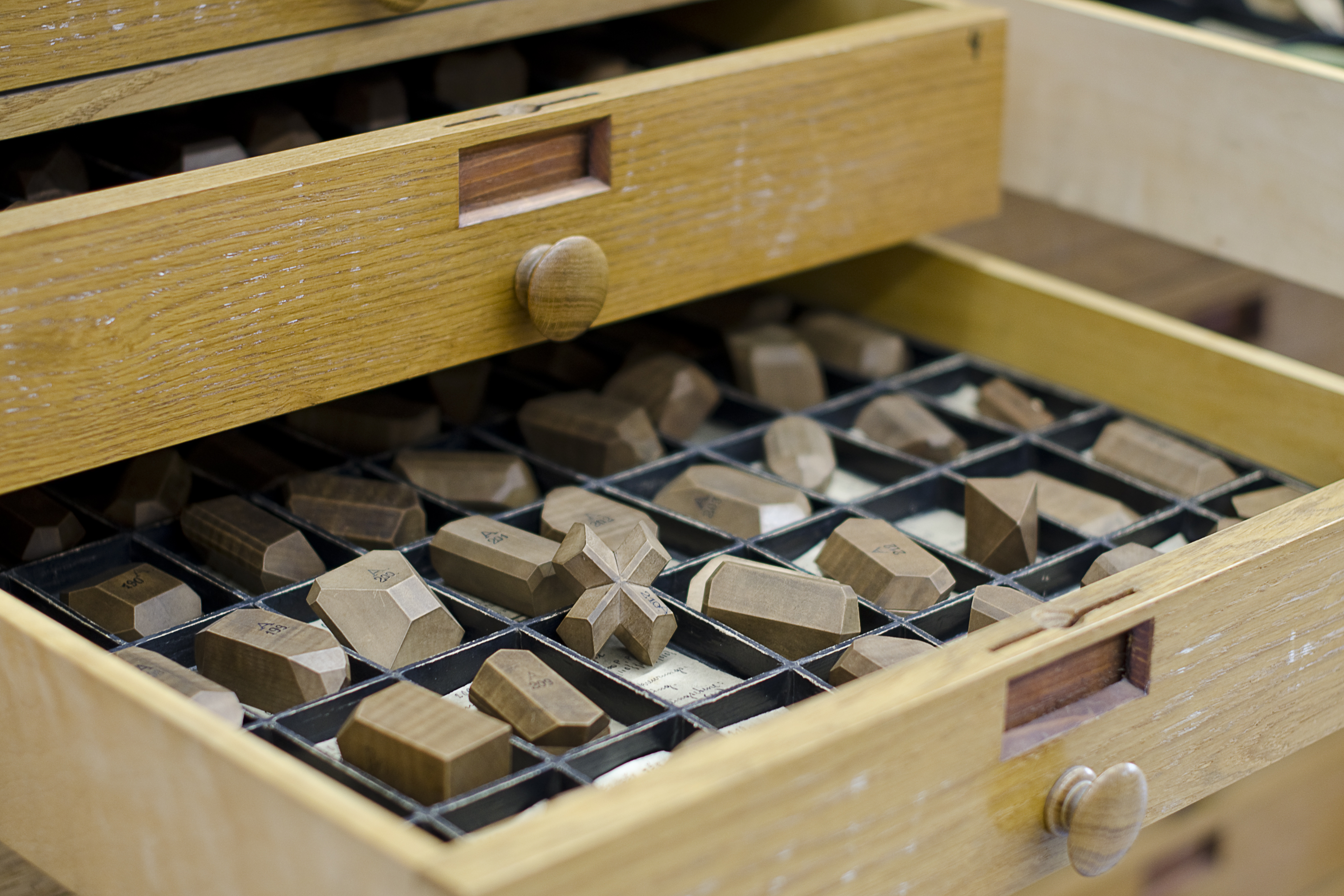
19th century collection of crystal models at the University of Innsbruck

The study of the optical properties of opaque substances has been closely linked with the development of suitable microscopes. The first instrument adapted to reflected light was the Lieberkühn reflector attributed to Johann Nathanael Lieberkühn. The use of polished and etched surfaces for this type of study was introduced by Jöns Jacob Berzelius in 1813. In 1858 Henry Clifton Sorby established the technique of cutting minerals and crystals into thin sections for examination under the polarizing microscope.

=== Crystal models ===
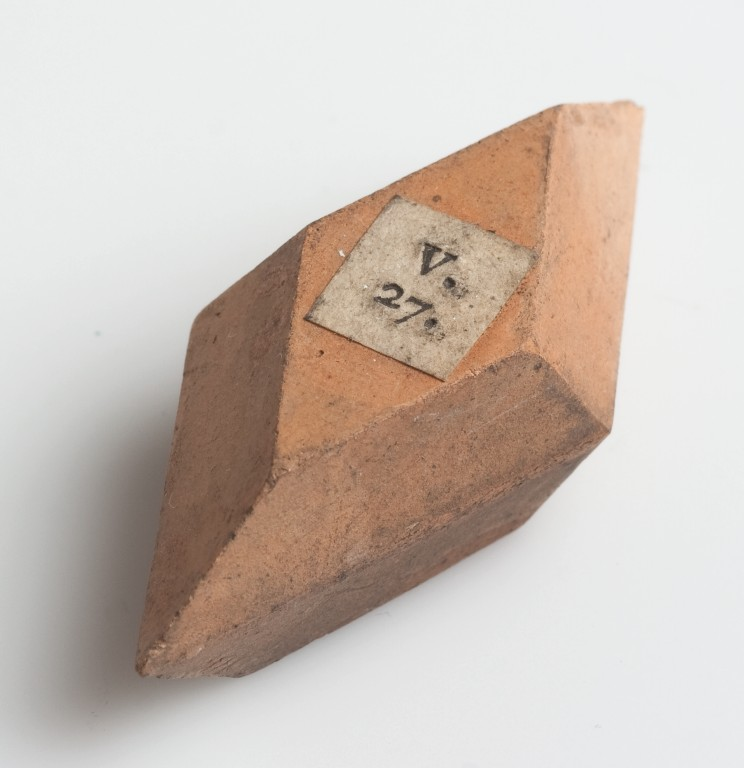
J.-B. L. Romé de l'Isle terracotta crystal model

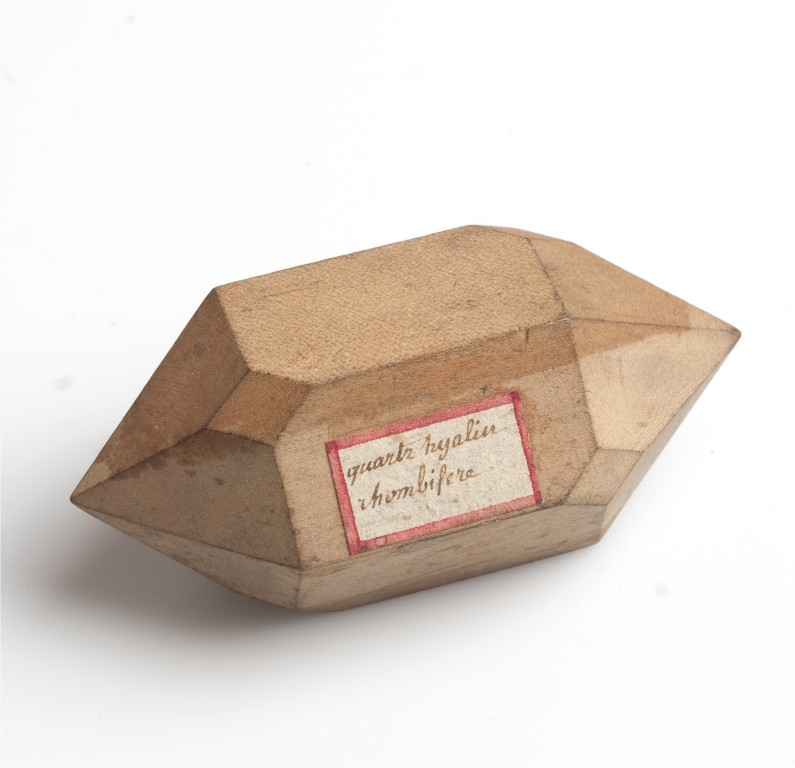
René Just Haüy pear wood crystal model

Late 18th/early 19th century crystal models

Drawings of crystal morphology were a feature of early writings on mineralogy. The descriptive period of mineralogy came to a conclusion with Paul Heinrich von Groth's systematic classification of minerals based on their chemical composition and crystal structure which were published in his monumental 5-volume Chemische Kristallographie of 1906–1919, which contained crystalline morphology and physical property data on nearly 10,000 substances.

Crystal drawings were useful in understanding morphology but, as teaching aids, they were inferior to three-dimensional crystal models. A crystal model allowed the easier identification of symmetry elements such as rotation axes and reflection planes.

Early collections of crystal models were made by Jean-Baptiste L. Romé de l'Isle to support the sale of his 1783 work Crystallographie, and by René Just Haüy to support the sale of his 1801 work Traité de Minéralogie. Models were made in a variety of materials including pear wood, terracotta, paper, plaster, cardboard, plate glass, and box wood. From 1850 Adam August Krantz offered a wide variety of collections of crystal models for sale.

== Academic community ==
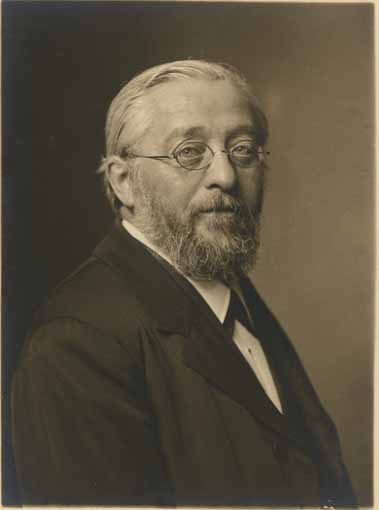
Paul Groth

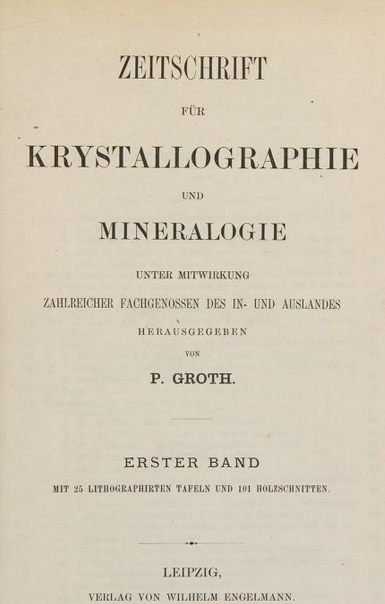
Z. Kryst., 1, 1877

Founder of Zeitschrift für Krystallographie

Before the 20th century crystallography was not a well-established academic discipline. There were no academic positions specifically in crystallography. Workers in the field normally carried out their crystallographic research as an ancillary to other employment(s), or had independent means. The leading workers in the field were employed as follows:

- Professors
  - Mathematics or science: Airy, Arago, E. Becquerel, Bergman, Berzelius, Biot, Bravais, Curie, Drude, Fedorov, Frankenheim, Guglielmini, Hamilton, Kepler, Lehmann, Liebig, Linnaeus, Mitscherlich, Ostwald, Pasteur, Plücker, Pockels, Reinitzer, Schoenflies, Seeber, Sohncke, Stokes, Thomson, Tyndall, Voigt Wöhler
  - Mineralogy: Delafosse, Groth, Haüy, Hessel, Liebisch, Mallard, Miller, Mohs, Naumann, Neumann, Sénarmont Weiss, Whewell
  - Other fields: Libavius (history)
- Physicians: Bartholinus, Cappeller, Hessel, Steno, Wollaston
- Clerics: Haüy, Steno
- Officials:
  - Military officers: Bravais, Gadolin, Malus
  - Municipal officials: Hooke, van Leeuwenhoek
- Other employment: Brewster (editor), Carangeot (business manager), Fresnel (engineer), Romé de l'Isle (cataloguer), Sohncke (meteorological service)
- Independently wealthy: Barlow, Herschel, Huygens

In the nineteenth century there were informal schools of crystallography researchers in France, Germany and England.

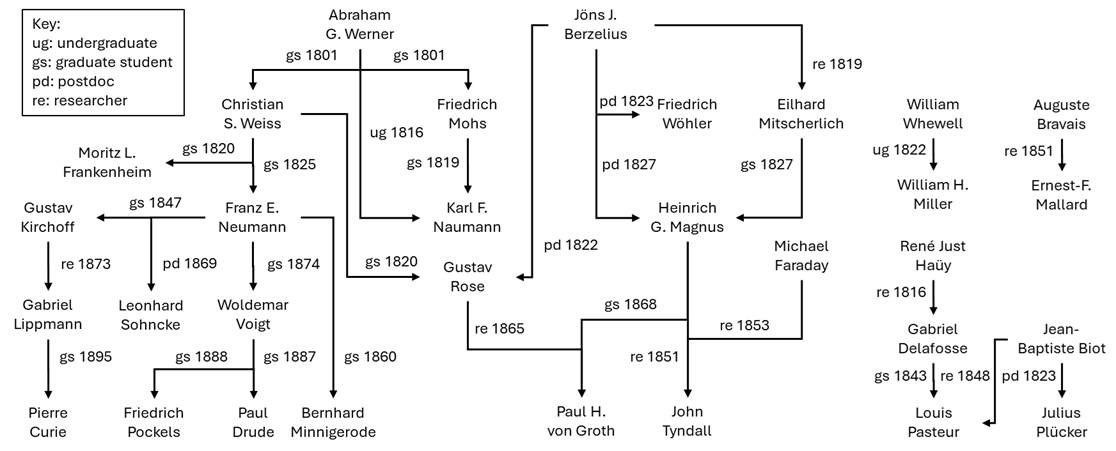
Academic relationships in the 19th century crystallography community.

Until the founding of Zeitschrift für Krystallographie und Mineralogie by Paul Groth in 1877 there was no lead journal for the publication of crystallographic papers. The majority of crystallographic research was published in the journals of national scientific societies, or in mineralogical journals. The inauguration of Groth's journal marked the emergence of crystallography as a mature science independent of geology.

== Bibliography ==
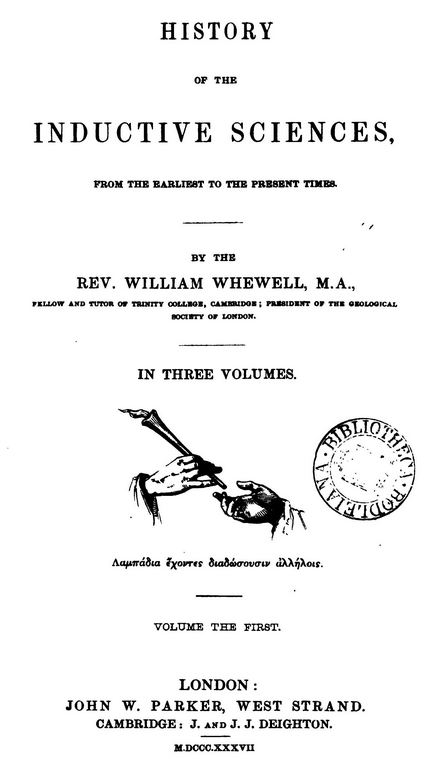

The following books have significant coverage of the history of crystallography before X-rays:

- 1825: Carl Michael Marx, Geschichte der Crystallkunde, in German Crystallography up to the early 19th century.
- 1837: William Whewell, History of the Inductive Sciences: From the Earliest to the Present Times Wide-ranging history of the sciences including a section on the history of mineralogy.
- 1918: Hélène Metzger, La Gènese de la Science de Cristaux, in French History of crystallography from the 17th to the early 18th century, with a particular focus on French scientists.
- 1926: Paul Heinrich von Groth, Entwicklungsgeschichte der Mineralogischen Wissenschaften, in German Mineralogical and crystallographical history to the end of the 19th century.
- 1962: Paul Peter Ewald, Fifty Years of X-ray diffraction Covers the historical background to the discovery of X-ray diffraction.
- 1966: John G. Burke, Origins of the science of crystals The development of crystallography from the mid-18th to the early 19th century with detailed consideration of the work of René Just Haüy; the book received generally positive reviews.
- 1976: Seymour H. Mauskopf, Crystals and compounds: molecular structure and composition in nineteenth-century French science. A well-reviewed monograph on the intersection of crystallography and molecular theory in the 19th century.
- 1978: Ilarion I. Shafranovskii, The History of Crystallography, in Russian, 2 vols. A detailed history of crystallography to 1912 with a particular focus on Russian scientists.
- 1986: Eginhard Fabian, Die Entdeckung der Kristalle: der historische Weg der Kristallforschung zur Wissenschaft, in German.
- 1988: Johann Jakob Burckhardt, Die Symmetrie der Kristalle: Von René-Just Haüy zur kristallographischen Schule in Zürich, in German. A study of the development of symmetry in crystallography.
- 1989: Erhard Scholz, Symmetrie, Gruppe, Dualität, in German. The first part traces the development of symmetry in crystallography in the 19th century. The book received mixed reviews.
- 1990: José Lima-de-Faria, Historical atlas of crystallographyl A collection of timelines, historical essays, portraits and book title pages.
- 2007: Curtis P. Schuh, Mineralogy & Crystallography: On the History of these Sciences through 1919 and Mineralogy and Crystallography: An Annotated Biobibliography, 2 vols. A large, unpublished compendium of historical and bibliographic information on crystallography and mineralogy.
- 2013: André Authier, Early days of x-ray crystallography. A detailed, up-to-date, and generally well-reviewed history of crystallography.

== See also ==
- Chemical crystallography before X-rays
- Geometrical crystallography before X-rays
- Physical crystallography before X-rays
- Timeline of crystallography

== Works cited ==
- Adams, Frank D. (1918). "Haüy, The "father of crystallography"". The American Mineralogist. 3: 131–132.
- Als-Nielsen, Jens (1 April 2017). "Early Days of X-ray Crystallography". American Journal of Physics (review). 85 (4): 318. Bibcode:2017AmJPh..85..318A. doi:10.1119/1.4967849.
- Alworth, William L. (1972). "Historical development of the concept of biological stereospecificity". Stereochemistry and its application in biochemistry: the relation between substrate symmetry and biological stereospecificity. New York: Wiley-Interscience. pp. 1–14. ISBN 0-471-02518-6.
- Amici, G. B. (1844). "Note sur an appareil de polarisation" [Note on a polarization device]. Annales de chimie et de physique (in French). 12: 114–120.
- Anatychuk, Lukyan I. (2024). "On the Discoverers of Thermoelectricity". In Anatychuk, Lukyan I.; Burkov, Alexander; Goldsmid, Hiroshi Julian; Grin, Yuri; Koumoto, Kunihito; Narducci, Dario; Nolas, George S. (eds.). 200 Years of Thermoelectricity: An Historical Journey Through the Science and Technology of Thermoelectric Materials (1821-2021). Springer Series in Materials Science. Vol. 328. Cham: Springer International Publishing. pp. 3–12. doi:10.1007/978-3-031-22108-8_1. ISBN 978-3-031-22107-1.
- Anon. (July 1927). "Entwicklungsgeschichte der mineralogischen Wissenschaften". Nature (review). 120 (3010): 43. Bibcode:1927Natur.120R..43.. doi:10.1038/120043c0.
- Arzruní, Andreás (1893). Physikalische Chemie der Krystalle [Physical chemistry of crystals] (in German). Braunschweig.
- Authier, A. (2013). Early days of x-ray crystallography. International Union of Crystallography Texts on Crystallography. Oxford: Oxford University Press. doi:10.1093/acprof:oso/9780199659845.001.0001. ISBN 9780198754053.
- Authier, A., ed. (2014). International Tables for Crystallography: Physical properties of crystals. Vol. D. p. 11. doi:10.1107/97809553602060000113. ISBN 978-1-118-76229-5.
- B., R. (April 1967). "Origins of the Science of Crystals. By J. G. Burke. 198 pp. with 25 figs. University of California Press; Berkeley and Los Angeles (Cambridge University Press; London), 1966. Price $6.50; 52 s.". Geological Magazine (review). 104 (2): 202–203. Bibcode:1967GeoM..104..202R. doi:10.1017/s001675680004084x.
- Babinet, J. (1839). "Un instrument destiné à la mesure des angles et à la détermination des indices de réfraction" [An instrument intended for the measurement of angles and the determination of refractive indices]. Comptes rendus hebdomadaires des séances de l'Académie des sciences (in French). 8: 710.
- Barlow, Malcolm (1 October 1963). "Fifty Years of X-Ray Diffraction". Physics Today (review). 16 (10): 70–72. Bibcode:1963PhT....16j..70E. doi:10.1063/1.3050566.
- Barlow, W.; Miers, H. A. (1901). "The Structure of Crystals". Report of The Seventy-First Meeting of the British Association for the Advancement of Science. London: John Murray. pp. 297–337.
- Bates, Frederick J. (1 May 1942). Polarimetry, saccharimetry and the sugars. Circular of the National Bureau of Standards. Washington, DC: U.S. Government Printing Office.
- Bernal, J. D. (1953). "Molecular asymmetry". Science and Industry in the Nineteenth Century. London: Routledge & Kegan Paul. pp. 181–219.
- Bernal, J. D. (June 1966). "Essay Reviews". The British Journal for the History of Science (review). 3 (1): 76–78. doi:10.1017/s0007087400000236. JSTOR 4025107.
- Bernstein, Joel (2002). "Introduction and historical background". Polymorphism in molecular crystals. Oxford; New York: Clarendon Press Oxford University Press. pp. 1–28. doi:10.1093/acprof:oso/9780199236565.003.0001. ISBN 0-19-850605-8.
- Berry, M. V.; Jeffrey, M. R. (2007). "Conical diffraction: Hamilton's diabolical point at the heart of crystal optics". In Wolf, E. (ed.). Progress in Optics. Vol. 50. Elsevier. pp. 13–50. Bibcode:2007PrOpt..50...13B. doi:10.1016/S0079-6638(07)50002-8. ISBN 978-0-444-53023-3.
- "Bertrand lens". encyclopedia.com.
- Biot, Jean-Baptiste (1812a). "Mémoire sur un nouveau genre d'oscillation que les molécules de la lumière éprouvent en traversant certains cristaux" [Memoir on a new kind of oscillation that light molecules experience when passing through certain crystals]. Mémoires de la Classe des Sciences Mathématiques et Physiques de l'Instut Impérial de France (in French). 13 (1): 1–371.
- Biot, Jean-Baptiste (1812b). "Sur la découverte d'une propriété nouvelle dont jouissent les forces polarisent des certains cristaux" [On the discovery of a new property demonstrated by the polarizing forces of certain crystals]. Mémoires de la Classe des Sciences Mathématiques et Physiques de l'Instut Impérial de France (in French). 13 (2): 19–30.
- Biot, Jean-Baptiste (1816). "De la polarisation de la lumière" [On the polarization of light]. Traité de physique expérimentale et mathématique (in French). Vol. 4. pp. 253–599.
- Birembaut, Arthur (1970). "Bravais, Auguste". In Gillispie, Charles Coulston (ed.). Dictionary of scientific biography. Vol. 2. New York: Scribner. pp. 430–432. ISBN 0684169630. Archived from the original on 16 November 2010.
- Birembaut, Arthur (1971). "Carangeot, Arnould". In Gillispie, Charles Coulston (ed.). Dictionary of scientific biography. Vol. 3. New York: Charles Scribner's Sons. pp. 61–62. ISBN 0684169649. Archived from the original on 23 February 2024.
- Black, Simon N.; Seton, Linda (19 June 2024). "Curating Morphological Data: From the Compendium of P. von Groth to the Cambridge Structural Database". Crystal Growth & Design. 24 (12): 5051–5060. Bibcode:2024CrGrD..24.5051B. doi:10.1021/acs.cgd.4c00269.
- Blunt, Wilfrid (1971). The compleat naturalist; a life of Linnaeus (1st ed.). New York: Viking Press. ISBN 067023396X.
- Boas, Marie (1969) [1959]. "Structure of matter and chemical theory in the seventeenth and eighteenth centuries". In Clagett, Marshall (ed.). Critical problems in the history of science. Madison, WI: The University of Wisconsin Press. pp. 499–514.
- Bos, H. J. M. (1972). "Huygens, Christiaan (Also Huyghens, Christian)". In Gillispie, Charles Coulston (ed.). Dictionary of scientific biography. Vol. 6. New York: Scribner. pp. 597–613. ISBN 0684101173. Archived from the original on 11 August 2021.
- Boulliard, Jean-Claude; Cabaret, Delphine; Giura, Paolo (2022). "René-Just Haüy and the birth of crystallography". IUCr Newsletter. 30 (4). IUCr.
- Bowden, Mary Ellen (1997). Chemical achievers: the human face of the chemical sciences. Philadelphia: Chemical Heritage Foundation. ISBN 0-941901-12-2.
- Brandmüller, J. (1986). "An extension of the Neumann–Minnigerode–Curie principle". Computers & Mathematics with Applications. 12 (1–2). Elsevier BV: 97–100. doi:10.1016/0898-1221(86)90143-4.
- Brenni, Paolo (1998). "Polarimeter and Polariscope". In Bud, Robert; Warner, Deborah Jean (eds.). Instruments of science: an historical encyclopedia. New York: Science Museum, London, and National Museum of American History, Smithsonian Institution, in association with Garland Pub. pp. 475–477. ISBN 0-8153-1561-9.
- Brewster, David (1831). Optics. London: Longman, Rees, Orme, Brown and Green. pp. 157–183.
- "History of crystallography". British Crystallographic Association.
- Brock, William H. (1997). Justus von Liebig: the chemical gatekeeper (1st ed.). Cambridge, U.K.: Cambridge University Press. ISBN 9780521562249.
- Buchwald, Jed Z. (1989). The rise of the wave theory of light: optical theory and experiment in the early 19th century. Chicago: Chicago University Press. ISBN 0-226-07884-1.
- Buerger, M. J.; Bloom, M. C. (1 November 1937). "Crystal Polymorphism". Zeitschrift für Kristallographie - Crystalline Materials. 96 (1–6): 182–200. doi:10.1524/zkri.1937.96.1.182.
- Burchard, Ulrich (1998). "History of the development of the crystallographic goniometer". The Mineralogical Record. 29 (6): 517–577, 580–583.
- Burckhardt, Johann Jakob (1984). "Die Entdeckung der 32 Kristallklassen durch M. L. Frankenheim in Jahre 1826" [The discovery of the 32 crystal classes by M. L. Frankenheim in 1826]. Neues Jahrbuch für Mineralogie - Monatshefte (in German). 31: 481–482.
- Burckhardt, Johann Jakob (1988). Die Symmetrie der Kristalle: Von René-Just Haüy zur kristallographischen Schule in Zürich [The symmetry of crystals: from René-Just Haüy to the crystallographic school in Zurich] (in German). Basel: Birkhäuser. ISBN 9783034860284.
- Burke, John G. (1966). Origins of the science of crystals. Berkeley, CA: University of California Press.
- Burke, John G. (1970). "Sohncke, Leonhard". In Gillispie, Charles Coulston (ed.). Dictionary of scientific biography. Vol. 12. New York: Charles Scribner's Sons. pp. 511–512. ISBN 0684129248. Archived from the original on 16 November 2010.
- Burke, John G. (1972). "Hessel, Johann Friedrich Christian". In Gillispie, Charles Coulston (ed.). Dictionary of scientific biography. Vol. 6. New York: Scribner. pp. 358–359. ISBN 0684101173. Archived from the original on 11 August 2021.
- Burke, John G. (1973). "Lehmann, Otto". In Gillispie, Charles Coulston (ed.). Dictionary of scientific biography. Vol. 8. New York: Charles Scribner's Sons. pp. 148–149. ISBN 068410119X. Archived from the original on 16 November 2010.
- Burke, John G. (1974a). "Mohs, Friedrich". In Gillispie, Charles Coulston (ed.). Dictionary of scientific biography. Vol. 9. New York: C. Scribner's sons. pp. 447–449. ISBN 0684101203. Archived from the original on 17 November 2010.
- Burke, John G. (1974b). "Naumann, Karl Friedrich". In Gillispie, Charles Coulston (ed.). Dictionary of scientific biography. Vol. 9. New York: C. Scribner's sons. p. 620. ISBN 0684101203. Archived from the original on 17 November 2010.
- Burke, John G. (1975). "Neumann, Franz Ernst". In Gillispie, Charles Coulston (ed.). Dictionary of scientific biography. Vol. 10. New York: C. Scribner's sons. pp. 26–29. ISBN 0684101211. Archived from the original on 2 June 2022.
- Cahn, Robert W. (12 August 1999). "Slaying the crystal homunculus". Nature. 400 (6745): 625. Bibcode:1999Natur.400..625C. doi:10.1038/23161.
- Carangeot, Arnould (1783). "Goniomètre, ou mesure-angle" [Goniometer, or angle-measure]. Observations sur la physique, sur l'histoire naturelle et sur les arts (in French). 22: 193–197.
- Cheshire, Frederic J. (1923). "The early history of the polariscope and the polarizing microscope". Journal of the Royal Microscopical Society. 43 (1): 1–18. doi:10.1111/j.1365-2818.1923.tb01380.x.
- Chimisso, Cristina (2019). Hélène Metzger: historian and historiographer of the sciences. Abingdon, Oxon New York, NY: Routledge. ISBN 9781315455372.
- Clarke, Frank Wigglesworth (1908). "The Progress and Development of Chemistry in the Nineteenth Century". In Rogers, Howard J. (ed.). International Congress of Arts and Science. Vol. 7: Physics and Chemistry. London: University Alliance. pp. 221–240.
- Correns, Carl W. (1972). "Frankenheim, Moritz Ludwig". In Gillispie, Charles Coulston (ed.). Dictionary of scientific biography. Vol. 5. New York: Scribner. p. 124. ISBN 0684101165. Archived from the original on 19 October 2022.
- Cromwell, Peter R. (1997). Polyhedra. Cambridge: Cambridge University Press. pp. 318–324. ISBN 9780521554329.
- Crosland, M. P. (1970). "Biot, Jean-Baptiste". In Gillispie, Charles Coulston (ed.). Dictionary of scientific biography. Vol. 2. New York: Scribner. pp. 133–140. ISBN 0684169630. Archived from the original on 16 November 2010.
- "Crystallographic Goniometers". Virtual Museum of the History of Mineralogy. mineralogy.eu. 2022.
- Cuevas-Diarte, Miguel Ángel; Reverter, Álvarez Santiago (2014). "Commented chronology of crystallography and structural chemistry". Dipòsit Digital. Universitat de Barcelona. p. 7. hdl:2445/120608.
- Curie, Marie (1923). Pierre Curie. Translated by Kellogg, Charlotte and Vernon. New York: The Macmillan Company. Archived from the original on 4 October 2019.
- Czapski, S. (1893). "Ein neues Krystallgoniometer" [A new crystal goniometer]. Zeitschrift für Instrumentenkunde (in German). 13: 1–5, 242–244.
- Dalton, John (1808). A new system of chemical philosophy. London: R. Bickerstaff. Archived from the original on 15 January 2008.
- Deas, Herbert D. (June 1959). "Crystallography and crystallographers in England in the early nineteenth century: a preliminary survey". Centaurus. 6 (2): 129–148. Bibcode:1959Cent....6..129D. doi:10.1111/j.1600-0498.1959.tb00253.x.
- Debré, Patrice (1998). "Crystals: A New Law". Louis Pasteur. Translated by Forster, Elborg. Baltimore: The Johns Hopkins University Press. pp. 29–51. ISBN 9780801865299.
- De Graef, Marc; McHenry, Michael E. (2012). Structure of materials: an introduction to crystallography, diffraction, and symmetry (2nd ed.). New York: Cambridge University Press. ISBN 978-1-107-00587-7.
- De Kruif, Paul (1996) [1926]. "Leeuwenhoek: First of the Microbe Hunters". Microbe hunters. San Diego: Harcourt Brace. pp. 1–22. ISBN 9780156002622.
- Dubov, P. L.; Frank-Kamenetskii, V. A.; Shafranovskii, I. I. (1991). "E. Fedorov and A. Schoenflies face to face (for the centenary of the derivation of the 230 Fedorov groups)". Soviet Physics Crystallography. 36 (3): 446–448.
- "Early Crystal Models". Virtual Museum of the History of Mineralogy. mineralogy.eu. 2022.
- Eckert, Michael; Schubert, Helmut; Torkar, Gisela; Blondel, Christine; Quédec, Pierre (1992). "The Roots of Solid-State Physics Before Quantum Mechanics". In Hoddeson, Lillian; Braun, Ernest; Teichmann, Jürgen; Weart, Spencer (eds.). Out of the crystal maze: chapters from the history of solid state physics. New York: Oxford University Press. ISBN 0-19-505329-X.
- Élie De Beaumont, Jean-Baptiste (1872) [1869]. "Memoir of Auguste Bravais". Annual report of the Board of Regents of the Smithsonian Institution. Translated by Alexander, C. A. Washington: Government Printing Office. pp. 145–168.
- Engel, Peter (1986). Geometric crystallography: an axiomatic introduction to crystallography. Dordrecht Boston Lancaster: D. Reidel. ISBN 90-277-2339-7.
- Evans, David S. (1972). "Herschel, John Frederick William". In Gillispie, Charles Coulston (ed.). Dictionary of scientific biography. Vol. 6. New York: Scribner. pp. 323–328. ISBN 0684101173. Archived from the original on 11 August 2021.
- Ewald, P. P., ed. (1962). Fifty Years of x-ray diffraction. Utrecht: Published for International Union of Crystallography by N. V. A. Oosthoek's Uitgeversmaatschappij.
- Fabian, Eginhard (1986). Die Entdeckung der Kristalle: der historische Weg der Kristallforschung zur Wissenschaft [The discovery of crystals: the historical path of crystal research to science] (in German) (1st ed.). Leipzig: VEB Deutscher Verlag für Grundstoffindustrie. ISBN 9783342001089.
- Fabian, Eginhard (June 1991). "Die Symmetrie der Kristalle: Von René-Just Haüy zur kristallographischen Schule in Zürich. J. J. Burckhardt, Erhard Scholz". Isis (review) (in German). 82 (2): 351–352. doi:10.1086/355764.
- Fankuchen, I. (14 December 1962). "Autobiography of a Science: Fifty Years of X-ray Diffraction. P. P. Ewald, Ed. Oosthoek's, Utrecht, Netherlands, 1962. ix + 717 pp. Illus. $11.25". Science (review). 138 (3546): 1254–1255. doi:10.1126/science.138.3546.1254.b.
- Fedorov, E. S. (1891). "Симметрія правильныхъ системъ фигуръ" [The symmetry of regular systems of figures]. Записки Императорского С.-Петербургского Минералогического Общества (Proceedings of the Imperial St. Petersburg Mineralogical Society, Series 2) (in Russian). 28: 1–146.
- Fedorow, E. von (1893). "Universal-(Theodolit-) Methode in der Mineralogie und Petrographie" [Universal (theodolite) method in mineralogy and petrography]. Zeitschrift für Krystallographie und Mineralogie (in German). 21: 574–714.
- Fedorow, E. von (1894). "Universal-(Theodolit-) Methode in der Mineralogie und Petrographie II. Theil. Krystalloptische Untersuchungen" [Universal (theodolite) method in mineralogy and petrography Part II. Crystal optical examinations]. Zeitschrift für Krystallographie und Mineralogie (in German). 22: 229–268.
- Ferraris, Giovanni (31 March 2019). "Early contributions of crystallography to the atomic theory of matter". Substantia. 3 (1): 131–138. doi:10.13128/Substantia-81.
- Ferraris, Giovanni (March 2020). "Historical notes on anisotropy". Rendiconti Lincei. Scienze Fisiche e Naturali. 31 (1): 5–7. Bibcode:2020RLSFN..31....5F. doi:10.1007/s12210-020-00870-5.
- Fischer, Walther (1972). "Groth, Paul Heinrich von". In Gillispie, Charles Coulston (ed.). Dictionary of scientific biography. Vol. 5. New York: Scribner. pp. 556–558. ISBN 0684101165. Archived from the original on 19 October 2022.
- Fischer, Walther (1975). "Sénarmont, Henri Hureau De". In Gillispie, Charles Coulston (ed.). Dictionary of scientific biography. Vol. 12. New York: Scribner. pp. 303–306. ISBN 0684129248. Archived from the original on 16 November 2010.
- Fisher, J. C. (1980). "Istoriia kristallografii" [The history of crystallography]. MathSciNet (review). American Mathematical Society. MR 0612025.
- Flack, H. D. (2009). "Louis Pasteur's discovery of molecular chirality and spontaneous resolution in 1848, together with a complete review of his crystallographic and chemical work" (PDF). Acta Crystallographica Section A. 65 (5): 371–389. Bibcode:2009AcCrA..65..371F. doi:10.1107/S0108767309024088. PMID 19687573. Archived from the original (PDF) on 8 September 2019.
- Fock, Andreas (1895). Pope, William J. (ed.). An introduction to chemical crystallography. Oxford: Clarendon Press.
- Freudenthal, Hans (1970). "Schoenflies, Arthur Moritz". In Gillispie, Charles Coulston (ed.). Dictionary of scientific biography. Vol. 12. New York: Charles Scribner's Sons. pp. 195–196. ISBN 0684129248. Archived from the original on 16 November 2010.
- Gadolin, C. Axel J. (1967). "Axel Gadolin 1828-1892 och hans finländska bakgrund" [Axel Gadolin 1828–1892 and his Finnish background]. Historiska och Litteraturhistoriska Studier (SLS) (in Finnish). 42. Helsingförs: 94–168.
- Gal, Joseph (February 2007). "Carl Friedrich Naumann and the introduction of enantio terminology: A review and analysis on the 150th anniversary". Chirality. 19 (2): 89–98. doi:10.1002/chir.20314. PMID 17096375.
- Gal, Joseph (January 2011). "Louis Pasteur, language, and molecular chirality. I. Background and Dissymmetry". Chirality. 23 (1): 1–16. doi:10.1002/chir.20866. PMID 20589938.
- Gal, Joseph (2013). "Molecular Chirality: Language, History, and Significance". In Schurig, Volker (ed.). Differentiation of Enantiomers I. Topics in Current Chemistry. Vol. 340. Cham: Springer. pp. 1–20. doi:10.1007/128_2013_435. ISBN 978-3-319-03238-2. PMID 23666078.
- Galiulin, R. V. (November 2003). "To the 150th anniversary of the birth of Evgraf Stepanovich Fedorov (1853–1919): Irregularities in the fate of the theory of regularity". Crystallography Reports. 48 (6): 899–913. Bibcode:2003CryRp..48..899G. doi:10.1134/1.1627430.
- Geison, Gerald L. (1975). "Pasteur, Louis". In Gillispie, Charles Coulston (ed.). Dictionary of scientific biography. Vol. 10. New York: C. Scribner's sons. pp. 350–416. ISBN 0684101211. Archived from the original on 2 June 2022.
- Geison, Gerald L.; Secord, James A. (1988). "Pasteur and the Process of Discovery: The Case of Optical Isomerism". Isis. 79 (1): 6–36. doi:10.1086/354632. JSTOR 234439. PMID 3286576.
- Glusker, Jenny P. (1990). "Brief history of chemical crystallography. II: Organic compounds". In Lima-de-Faria, J. (ed.). Historical atlas of crystallography. Dordrecht; Boston: Published for International Union of Crystallography by Kluwer Academic Publishers. pp. 91–93. ISBN 079230649X.
- Goldberg, Marvin C.; Weiner, Eugene R. (1989). "The Science of Luminescence". In Goldberg, Marvin C. (ed.). Luminescence Applications in Biological, Chemical, Environmental, and Hydrological Sciences. Washington, DC: American Chemical Society. p. 4. doi:10.1021/bk-1989-0383.ch001. ISBN 9780841215603.
- Goldbers, Stanley (1976). "Voigt, Woldemar". In Gillispie, Charles Coulston (ed.). Dictionary of scientific biography. Vol. 14. New York: Scribner. pp. 61–63. ISBN 0684129264. Archived from the original on 17 November 2010.
- Goldschmidt, V. (1893). "Goniometer mit zwei Kreisen. (Krystallmessung durch Ortsbestimmung)" [Goniometer with two circles. (Crystal measurement by location determination)]. Zeitschrift für Krystallographie und Mineralogie (in German). 21: 210–232.
- Goodman, D. C. (June 1968). "History of Crystallography - Origins of the Science of Crystals. By John G. Burke. Pp. 198, illustr. University of California Press and Cambridge University Press. 1966. 52 s.". The British Journal for the History of Science (review). 4 (1): 88–89. doi:10.1017/s0007087400003368.
- Goodman, D. C. (November 1969). "Problems in Crystallography in the Early Nineteenth Century". Ambix. 16 (3): 152–166. doi:10.1179/amb.1969.16.3.152.
- Goodman, D. C. (1976). "Wollaston, William Hyde". In Gillispie, Charles Coulston (ed.). Dictionary of scientific biography. Vol. 14. New York: C. Scribner's sons. pp. 486–494. ISBN 0684129264. Archived from the original on 17 November 2010.
- Gough, J. B. (1970). "Becquerel, Alexandre-Edmond". In Gillispie, Charles Coulston (ed.). Dictionary of scientific biography. Vol. 1. New York: Scribner. pp. 555–556. ISBN 0684169630. Archived from the original on 10 September 2012.
- Groth, P. (1906–1919). Chemische Krystallographie [Chemical Crystallography] (in German). Vol. 1–5. Leipzig: W. Engelmann.
- Groth, P. (2013) [1926]. Entwicklungsgeschichte der Mineralogischen Wissenschaften [History of the Mineralogical Sciences] (in German). Berlin: Springer. doi:10.1007/978-3-662-41394-4. ISBN 978-3-662-40910-7.
- Grünbaum, Branko; Senechal, Marjorie (November 1991). "Symmetrie-Gruppe-Dualität". Historia Mathematica (review). 18 (4): 377–380. doi:10.1016/0315-0860(91)90382-8.
- Guinet, Leon (April 1921). "La genèse de la Science des Cristaux. Helene Metzger". Isis (review) (in French). 3 (3): 445–446. doi:10.1086/357966.
- Hahn, Roger (1981). "Arago, Dominique François Jean". In Gillispie, Charles Coulston (ed.). Dictionary of scientific biography. Vol. 1. New York: Charles Scribner's Sons. pp. 200–203. ISBN 0-684-16963-0. Archived from the original on 10 September 2012.
- Hales, Thomas C. (2006). "Historical Overview of the Kepler Conjecture". Discrete & Computational Geometry. 36 (1): 5–20. doi:10.1007/s00454-005-1210-2. ISSN 0179-5376.
- Hankins, Thomas L. (1980). Sir William Rowan Hamilton. Baltimore: Johns Hopkins University Press. ISBN 0801822033.
- Hargittai, Balazs; Hargittai, Istvan (April 2024). "150 years of stereochemistry—selected examples". Structural Chemistry. 35 (2): 383–392. Bibcode:2024StrCh..35..383H. doi:10.1007/s11224-023-02276-z.
- Harvey, E. Newton (1957). A history of luminescence from the earliest times until 1900. Philadelphia, PA: The American Philosophical Society.
- Haüy, René-Just (1801). Traité de Minéralogie [Mineralogical treatise] (in French). Vol. 1–5. Paris: Chez Louis.
- Helliwell, John R. (1 January 2014). "Early Days of X-ray Crystallography. By André Authier. International Union of Crystallography/Oxford University Press, 2013. Pp. xiv + 441. Price (hardcover) GBP 45.00. ISBN 978-0-19-965984-5". Acta Crystallographica Section A: Foundations and Advances (review). 70 (1): 92–94. doi:10.1107/S2053273313027642.
- Heniger, Johannes (1973). "Leeuwenhoek, Antoni van". In Gillispie, Charles Coulston (ed.). Dictionary of scientific biography. Vol. 8. New York: Charles Scribner's Sons. pp. 126–130. ISBN 068410119X. Archived from the original on 16 November 2010.
- Henriksen, Paul W. (December 1991). "Historical Atlas of Crystallography. J. Lima-de-Faria". Isis (review). 82 (4): 792–793. doi:10.1086/356017.
- Herschel, John (1830). Preliminary discourse on the study of natural philosophy. London: Longman. p. 354.
- Hiebert, Erwin N.; Körber, Hans-Günther (1981). "Ostwald, Friedrich Wilhelm". In Gillispie, Charles Coulston (ed.). Dictionary of scientific biography. Vol. 15: Supplement 1. New York: Charles Scribner's Sons. pp. 455–469. ISBN 0-684-16970-3. Archived from the original on 17 November 2010.
- Hoddeson, Lillian; Braun, Ernest; Teichmann, Jürgen; Weart, Spencer, eds. (1992). Out of the crystal maze: chapters from the history of solid state physics. New York: Oxford University Press. ISBN 0-19-505329-X.
- Hoffmann, D. (3 July 2006). "Paul Drude (1863–1906)". Annalen der Physik. 518 (7–8): 449–460. Bibcode:2006AnP...518..449H. doi:10.1002/andp.200651807-802.
- Hoffmann, Frank (2020). Introduction to crystallography (1st ed.). Cham, Switzerland: Springer. ISBN 978-3-030-35109-0.
- Holser, William T. (1974). "Mallard, (François) Ernest". In Gillispie, Charles Coulston (ed.). Dictionary of scientific biography. Vol. 9. New York: C. Scribner's sons. pp. 58–60. ISBN 0684101203. Archived from the original on 17 November 2010.
- Holser, William T. (1976). "Weiss, Christian Samuel". In Gillispie, Charles Coulston (ed.). Dictionary of scientific biography. Vol. 14. New York: C. Scribner's sons. pp. 239–242. ISBN 0684129264. Archived from the original on 17 November 2010.
- Holser, William T. (1981). "Barlow, William". In Gillispie, Charles Coulston (ed.). Dictionary of scientific biography. Vol. 1. New York: Charles Scribner's Sons. pp. 460–463. ISBN 0-684-16963-0. Archived from the original on 10 September 2012.
- Hon, Giora; Goldstein, Bernard R. (2008). From Summetria to Symmetry: The Making of a Revolutionary Scientific Concept. Dordrecht: Springer Netherlands. pp. 188–198. ISBN 9781402084478.
- Hooykaas, R. (December 1967). "Origins of the Science of Crystals. John G. Burke". Isis (review). 58 (4): 568–570. doi:10.1086/350314.
- Hooykaas, R. (1972). "Haüy, René-Just". In Gillispie, Charles Coulston (ed.). Dictionary of scientific biography. Vol. 6. New York: Scribner. pp. 178–183. ISBN 0684101173. Archived from the original on 11 August 2021.
- Hooykaas, R. (1981). "Romé De l'Isle, Jean-Baptiste Louis". In Gillispie, Charles Coulston (ed.). Dictionary of scientific biography. Vol. 11. New York: Charles Scribner's & Sons. pp. 520–524. ISBN 0684169681. Archived from the original on 24 October 2011.
- Hoppe, Edmund (1926). "Geschichte Der Physik" [History of Physics]. Geschichte der Physik Vorlesungstechnik (in German). Braunschweig: Verlag von Friedr. Vieweg & Sohn. pp. 1–179. doi:10.1007/978-3-7091-9796-7_1.
- Hubicki, Włodzimierz (1973). "Libavius (or Libau), Andreas". In Gillispie, Charles Coulston (ed.). Dictionary of scientific biography. Vol. 8. New York: Scribner. pp. 309–312. ISBN 068410119X. Archived from the original on 16 November 2010.
- Huyghens, Christiaan (1690). Traité de la lumière [Treatise on light] (in French). Leiden: Pieter van der Aa.
- Institute of Physics (2022). "Crystallography: How discovering crystal structure gave meaning to matter".
- Jackson, Roland (2 October 2015). "John Tyndall and the Early History of Diamagnetism". Annals of Science. 72 (4): 435–489. doi:10.1080/00033790.2014.929743. PMC 4524391. PMID 26221835.
- Jaeger, Francis Mauritius (1920). Lectures on the principle of symmetry and its applications in all natural sciences (2nd ed.). Amsterdam: Elsevier.
- Janner, A. (1988). "Die Symmetrie der Kristalle. Von René-Just Haüy zur kristallographischen Schule in Zürich. Mit einem Beitrag von Erhard Scholz". zbMATH Open (review). Zbl 0644.01004.
- Jelley, Edwin E. (12 September 1942). "A review of crystallographic microscopy". Journal of the Royal Microscopical Society. 62 (3–4): 93–102. doi:10.1111/j.1365-2818.1942.tb00904.x.
- Jorpes, J. Erik (1966). Jac. Berzelius: his life and work. Stockholm: Almqvist & Wiksell.
- Kahr, Bart; McBride, J. Michael (January 1992). "Optically Anomalous Crystals". Angewandte Chemie International Edition in English. 31 (1): 1–26. doi:10.1002/anie.199200013.
- Kaiser, Walter (1987). "Symmetries in romantic physics". In Doncel, Manuel D.; Hermann, Armin; Michel, Louis; Pais, Abraham (eds.). Symmetries in physics (1600–1980). Barcelona: Universitat Autònoma de Barcelona. pp. 77–92. ISBN 84-7488-148-X.
- Katzir, Shaul (1 January 2003a). "The Discovery of the Piezoelectric Effect". Archive for History of Exact Sciences. 57 (1): 61–91. doi:10.1007/s00407-002-0059-5.
- Katzir, Shaul (1 September 2003b). "From explanation to description: Molecular and phenomenological theories of piezoelectricity". Historical Studies in the Physical and Biological Sciences. 34 (1): 69–94. doi:10.1525/hsps.2003.34.1.69.
- Katzir, Shaul (September 2004). "The emergence of the principle of symmetry in physics". Historical Studies in the Physical and Biological Sciences. 35 (1): 35–65. doi:10.1525/hsps.2004.35.1.35.
- Katzir, Shaul (2006). The beginnings of piezoelectricity: a study in mundane physics. Dordrecht: Springer. ISBN 978-1-4020-4669-8.
- Katzir, Shaul (2008). "Woldemar Voigt". In Koertge, Noretta (ed.). New dictionary of scientific biography. Vol. 7. Detroit: Charles Scribner's Sons/Thomson Gale. pp. 164–166. ISBN 978-0-684-31328-3.
- Katzir, Shaul (1 March 2016). "André Authier. Early Days of X-ray Crystallography. (International Union of Crystallography Books Series.) xiv + 441 pp., illus., figs., tables, bibl., index. Oxford: Oxford University Press, 2013. £22.50 (cloth)". Isis (review). 107 (1): 187–188. doi:10.1086/686164.
- Kauffman, George B. (1974). "Magnus, Heinrich Gustav". In Gillispie, Charles Coulston (ed.). Dictionary of scientific biography. Vol. 9. New York: C. Scribner's sons. pp. 18–19. ISBN 0684101203. Archived from the original on 17 November 2010.
- Kauffman, George B. (October 1977). "Crystals and Compounds: Molecular Structure and Composition in Nineteenth-century France (Mauskopf, Seymour H.)". Journal of Chemical Education (review). 54 (10): A431. Bibcode:1977JChEd..54Q.431K. doi:10.1021/ed054pa431.1.
- Kauffman, George B.; Myers, Robin D. (December 1998). "Pasteur's Resolution of Racemic Acid: A sesquicentennial Retrospect and a New Translation" (PDF). The Chemical Educator. 3 (6): 1–4. doi:10.1007/s00897980257a. Archived from the original (PDF) on 17 January 2006.
- Keen, Robin (2005). Buttner, Johannes (ed.). The life and works of Friedrich Wöhler (1800-1882) (PDF). Nordhausen: Traugott Bautz. ISBN 9783883092249.
- Kelker, H. (January 1973). "History of Liquid Crystals". Molecular Crystals and Liquid Crystals. 21 (1–2): 1–48. Bibcode:1973MCLC...21....1K. doi:10.1080/15421407308083312.
- Kelker, H. (December 1988). "Survey of the Early History of Liquid Crystals". Molecular Crystals and Liquid Crystals Incorporating Nonlinear Optics. 165 (1): 1–43. Bibcode:1988MCLCI.165....1K. doi:10.1080/00268948808082195.
- Kelker, Hans; Knoll, Peter M. (July 1989). "Plenary Lecture. Some pictures of the history of liquid crystals". Liquid Crystals. 5 (1): 19–42. Bibcode:1989LoCr....5...19K. doi:10.1080/02678298908026350.
- Kepler, Johannes (1966). Hardie, Colin (ed.). The Six-Cornered Snowflake. Oxford: Oxford University Press. pp. 52–53.
- Koetsier, T. (June 1991). "Erhard Scholz. Symmetrie, Gruppe, Dualität: Zur Beziehung zwischen theoretischer Mathematik und Anwendungen in Kristallographie und Baustatik des 19 Jahrhunderts. Basel, Boston, Berlin: Birkhäuser, 1989. Pp. 406. ISBN 3-7643-1974-7. SFr. 84.00". The British Journal for the History of Science (review). 24 (2): 265–266. doi:10.1017/S000708740002728X.
- Kostyanovsky, Remir G. (January 2003). "Louis Pasteur did it for us especially". Mendeleev Communications. 13 (3): 85–90. doi:10.1070/mc2003v013n03abeh001828.
- "Krantz Crystallography Catalogs". Virtual Museum of the History of Mineralogy. mineralogy.eu. 2022.
- Kraus, Edward H. (1918). "Haüy's contribution to our knowledge of isomorphism". The American Mineralogist. 3: 126–130.
- Kubbinga, Henk (January 2012). "Crystallography from Haüy to Laue: controversies on the molecular and atomistic nature of solids". Zeitschrift für Kristallographie. 227 (1): 1–26. Bibcode:2012ZK....227....1K. doi:10.1524/zkri.2012.1459.
- Kuhn, Thomas S. (1962). The Structure of Scientific Revolutions (1st ed.). University of Chicago Press. LCCN 62019621.
- Kunz, George F. (1918). "The life and work of Haüy". The American Mineralogist. 3: 60–89.
- L., A. (1919). "Hélène Metzger, La genèse de la science des cristaux, 1 vol. in-8°, 248 pp., Paris, F. Alcan, 1918". Revue Philosophique de la France et de l'Étranger (review) (in French). 88: 325–330. JSTOR 41081747.
- Ladd, Marcus Frederick Charles (2014). Symmetry of crystals and molecules. Oxford: Oxford University Press. pp. 13–15. ISBN 9780199670888.
- Lalena, John N. (April 2006). "From quartz to quasicrystals: probing nature's geometric patterns in crystalline substances". Crystallography Reviews. 12 (2): 125–180. Bibcode:2006CryRv..12..125L. doi:10.1080/08893110600838528.
- Lang, Sydney B. (1974). "History of pyroelectricity". Sourcebook of pyroelectricity. London New York Paris: Gordon and Breach science. pp. 85–156. ISBN 0677015801.
- Lang, S.B. (April 2004). "A 2400 year history of pyroelectricity: from Ancient Greece to exploration of the solar system". British Ceramic Transactions. 103 (2): 65–70. Bibcode:2004BrCTr.103...65L. doi:10.1179/096797804225012765.
- Larman, Emil Karlovich (1969). Аксель Вильгельмович Гадолин 1828-1892 [Axel Vilhelmovich Gadolin 1828-1892] (in Russian). Moscow: Nauka.
- Lehmann, O. (2004). "On flowing crystals". In Sluckin, Tim; Dunmur, David; Stegemeyer, Horst (eds.). Crystals that flow: classic papers from the history of liquid crystals. London; New York: Taylor & Francis. pp. 42–53. ISBN 978-0-415-25789-3.
- Lennartson, Anders (2020). "Bergman's Contributions to Mineralogy". Carl Wilhelm Scheele and Torbern Bergman: the science, lives and friendship of two pioneers in chemistry. Cham: Springer. pp. 346–357. ISBN 9783030491932.
- Lima-de-Faria, José, ed. (1990). Historical atlas of crystallography. Dordrecht/Boston/London: Kluwer Academic Publishers. ISBN 9780792306498.
- Lindroth, Sten (1973). "Linnaeus (or von Linné), Carl". In Gillispie, Charles Coulston (ed.). Dictionary of scientific biography. Vol. 8. New York: Charles Scribner's Sons. pp. 374–381. ISBN 068410119X. Archived from the original on 16 November 2010.
- Lipson, H. (1 June 1963). "Fifty years of X-ray diffraction by P. P. Ewald". Acta Crystallographica (review). 16 (6): 578. Bibcode:1963AcCry..16..578L. doi:10.1107/s0365110x63001559.
- M., H. A. (21 January 1928). "Prof. P. H. Von Groth, For. Mem. R.S.". Nature. 121 (3038): 98–107. Bibcode:1928Natur.121...98H. doi:10.1038/121098a0.
- Mackay, A. L. (1 March 1982). "A history of crystallography. I: From earliest times to the beginning of the nineteenth century. II: In the nineteenth century by I. I. Shafranovskii". Acta Crystallographica Section A (review). 38 (2): 288. Bibcode:1982AcCrA..38..288M. doi:10.1107/S056773948200062X.
- MacLeod, Roy (1981). "Tyndall, John". In Gillispie, Charles Coulston (ed.). Dictionary of scientific biography. Vol. 13. New York: Scribner. pp. 521–524. ISBN 068416969X. Archived from the original on 11 October 2019.
- Maitte, Bernard (2001). "René-Just Haüy (1743–1822) et la naissance de la cristallographie". Travaux du Comité français d'Histoire de la Géologie (in French). 15: 115–149.
- Maitte, Bernard (2013). "The Construction of Group Theory in Crystallography". In Barbin, E.; Pisano, R. (eds.). The Dialectic Relation Between Physics and Mathematics in the XIXth Century. History of Mechanism and Machine Science. Vol. 16. Dordrecht: Springer. pp. 15–18. doi:10.1007/978-94-007-5380-8_1. ISBN 978-94-007-5380-8.
- Malus, Étienne-Louis (January 1809). "Sur une propriété de la lumière réfléchie par les corps diaphanes" [On a property of light reflected by translucent bodies]. Nouveau bulletin des sciences par la Société philomathique de Paris (in French) (16): 266–269.
- Malus, Étienne-Louis (1817). "Description et usage d'un goniomètre répétiteur" [Description and usage of a repeating goniometer]. Mémoires de physique et de chimie de la Société d'Arcueil (in French). 3: 122–129.
- Marx, Carl Michael (1825). Geschichte der Crystallkunde [History of crystal science] (in German). Archived from the original on 2 February 2008.
- Mascarenhas, Yvonne Primerano (2020). "Crystallography before the Discovery of X-Ray Diffraction". Revista Brasileira de Ensino de Física. 42 e20190336. doi:10.1590/1806-9126-RBEF-2019-0336.
- "Mathematics Genealogy Project". North Dakota State University.
- Mauskopf, Seymour H. (July 1976). "Crystals and compounds: molecular structure and composition in nineteenth-century French science". Transactions of the American Philosophical Society. New Series. 66 (3): 5–82. doi:10.2307/1006279. ISBN 0871696630. JSTOR 1006279.
- Mauskopf, Seymour (2006). "A history of chirality". In Busch, Kenneth L.; Busch, Marianna A. (eds.). Chiral analysis. Amsterdam Boston Heidelberg: Elsevier. pp. 3–24. doi:10.1016/B978-044451669-5/50001-6. ISBN 978-0-444-51669-5.
- Mauskopf, Seymour (30 April 2012). "Seeds to Symmetry to Structure: Crystallography and the Search for Atomic-Molecular Arrangement". University of Illinois at Urbana-Champaign.
- Mauskopf, Seymour H. (3 April 2015). "William Barlow and the Determination of Atomic Arrangement in Crystals: Essay in Honour of Alan J. Rocke". Annals of Science. 72 (2): 206–223. doi:10.1080/00033790.2015.1007524. PMID 26104165.
- Mayer, Gaston (1977). "Kappeler (Cappeler), Moritz Anton". Neue Deutsche Biographie (in German). Vol. 11. Berlin: Duncker & Humblot. pp. 138–139. (full text online).
- McKie, Duncan (1974). "Miller, William Hallowes". In Gillispie, Charles Coulston (ed.). Dictionary of scientific biography. Vol. 9. New York: Charles Scribner's Sons. pp. 392–393. ISBN 0684101203. Archived from the original on 17 November 2010.
- Melhado, Evan M. (1 January 1980). "Mitscherlich's Discovery of Isomorphism". Historical Studies in the Physical Sciences. 11 (1): 87–123. doi:10.2307/27757472. JSTOR 27757472.
- Melhado, Evan M. (1981). Jacob Berzelius: the emergence of his chemical system. Stockholm: Almqvist & Wiksell. ISBN 91-85286-21-4.
- Meniailov, A. (1972). "Fyodorov (or Fedorov), Evgraf Stepanovich". In Gillispie, Charles Coulston (ed.). Dictionary of scientific biography. Vol. 5. New York: Scribner. pp. 210–214. ISBN 0684101165. Archived from the original on 19 October 2022.
- Metzger, Hélène (1969) [1918]. La Gènese de la Science de Cristaux [The Genesis of Crystal Science] (in French). Paris: Albert Blanchard. Archived from the original on 2 October 2021.
- Mieleitner, Karl (1923). "Die Anfänge der Theorien über die Struktur der Kristalle. Domenico Guglielminis "Philosophische Betrachtungen, abgeleitet von den Formen der Salze"" [The beginnings of theories about the structure of crystals. Domenico Guglielmini's Philosophical Reflections, Derived from the Forms of Salts]. Fortschritte der Mineralogie (in German). 8: 199–234.
- Mitov, Michel (19 May 2014). "Liquid-Crystal Science from 1888 to 1922: Building a Revolution". ChemPhysChem. 15 (7): 1245–1250. doi:10.1002/cphc.201301064. PMID 24482315.
- Mitscherlich, Eilhard (1843). "Über eın Goniometer" [On a goniometer]. Abhandlungen der Königlichen Akademie der Wissenschaften zu Berlin (in German): 189–197.
- Mönch, E. (1986). "A Historical Survey of the Development of Photoelasticity in Germany, Especially in Munich". In Nisida, Masataka; Kawata, Kozo (eds.). Photoelasticity. International Symposium on Photoelasticity. Tokyo: Springer. pp. 1–8. doi:10.1007/978-4-431-68039-0_1. ISBN 978-4-431-68039-0.
- Moore, Moreton (November 1990a). "Crystals on the map". Nature (review). 348 (6300): 400–401. Bibcode:1990Natur.348R.400M. doi:10.1038/348400b0.
- Moore, Paul B. (1990b). "Brief history of chemical crystallography. I: Inorganic compounds". In Lima-de-Faria, J. (ed.). Historical atlas of crystallography. Dordrecht; Boston: Published for International Union of Crystallography by Kluwer Academic Publishers. pp. 77–90. ISBN 079230649X.
- Morse, Edgar W. (1970). "Brewster, David". In Gillispie, Charles Coulston (ed.). Dictionary of scientific biography. Vol. 2. New York: Scribner. pp. 451–454. ISBN 0684169630. Archived from the original on 16 November 2010.
- Moser, Tijmen Jan; Robinson, Enders A. (2024). "Anisotropy and Ellipsoidal Wavelets". Walking with Christiaan Huygens: from Archimedes' influence to unsung contributions in modern science. Cham: Springer. pp. 74–80. doi:10.1007/978-3-031-46158-3. ISBN 978-3-031-46157-6.
- Narasimhamurty, Tamma S. (1981). Photoelastic and Electro-Optic Properties of Crystals. Boston, MA: Springer US. p. vii. doi:10.1007/978-1-4757-0025-1. ISBN 978-1-4757-0027-5.
- Narasimhan, T. N. (1 August 2010). "Thermal conductivity through the 19th century". Physics Today. 63 (8): 36–41. arXiv:1005.2119. Bibcode:2010PhT....63h..36N. doi:10.1063/1.3480074.
- "Neumann's principle". Online Dictionary of Crystallography. International Union of Crystallography. 16 November 2017.
- Nicol, James (1878). "Crystallography". Encyclopaedia Britannica. Vol. 6 (Ninth ed.). New York: Charles Scribner's Sons. pp. 671–677.
- Nicol, William (1829). "On a Method of so far increasing the Divergency of the two Rays in Calcarcous-spar, that only one Image may be seen at a time". The Edinburgh New Philosophical Journal. 6: 83–84.
- O'Hara, J. G. (1982). "The Prediction and Discovery of Conical Refraction by William Rowan Hamilton and Humphrey Lloyd (1832-1833)". Proceedings of the Royal Irish Academy. Section A: Mathematical and Physical Sciences. 82A (2): 231–257. ISSN 0035-8975. JSTOR 20489156.
- Oldroyd, D. R. (1 November 1974). "Some Neo-Platonic and Stoic Influences on Mineralogy in the Sixteenth and Seventeenth Centuries". Ambix. 21 (2–3): 128–156. doi:10.1179/000269874790223614.
- Ollis, W. D. (1972). "Models and molecules". Proceedings of the Royal Institution of Great Britain. 45: 1–31.
- "Optical Instruments". Virtual Museum of the History of Mineralogy. mineralogy.eu. 2022.
- Orcel, Jean (1972). "Historical note". Microscopic study of opaque minerals. By Galopin, R.; Henry, N. F. M. (in French). Cambridge: W. Heffer and Sons. pp. 301–305. ISBN 978-0-85270-047-1.
- Pabst, A. (1981). "Rose, Gustav". In Gillispie, Charles Coulston (ed.). Dictionary of scientific biography. Vol. 11. New York: Charles Scribner's & Sons. pp. 539–540. ISBN 0684169681. Archived from the original on 24 October 2011.
- Palache, Charles (February 1920). "The two-circle goniometer" (PDF). The American Mineralogist. 5 (2): 23–33.
- Pasteur, Louis (1905) [1860]. Researches on the molecular asymmetry of natural organic products. Edinburgh: The Alembic Club. pp. 11–12.
- Paufler, P. (March 1990). "J. J. Burckhardt. Die Symmetrie der Kristalle. Von René Just Haüy zur kristallographischen Schule in Zürich. Mit einem von E. Scholz. Birkhäuser Verlag Basel, Boston, Berlin (1988) 196 Seiten, und 64 Abb., Preis SFR 58.—, ISBN 3-7643-1918-6". Crystal Research and Technology (review) (in German). 25 (3): 284. Bibcode:1990CryRT..25..284P. doi:10.1002/crat.2170250310.
- Paufler, P. (1 December 1994). "Historical Atlas of Crystallography]". Zeitschrift für Kristallographie - Crystalline Materials (review). 209 (12): 1008–1009. Bibcode:1994ZK....209.1008P. doi:10.1524/zkri.1994.209.12.1008a.
- Paufler, Peter (18 December 2019). "William Barlow's early publications in the 'Zeitschrift für Krystallographie und Mineralogie' and their influence on crystal structure research". Zeitschrift für Kristallographie - Crystalline Materials. 234 (11–12): 769–785. doi:10.1515/zkri-2019-0044.
- Paufler, Peter; Filatov, Stanislav K. (18 February 2020). "E. S. Fedorov Promoting the Russian-German Scientific Interrelationship". Minerals. 10 (2): 181. Bibcode:2020Mine...10..181P. doi:10.3390/min10020181.
- Pedersen, Kurt Møller (1974). "Malus, Étienne Louis". In Gillispie, Charles Coulston (ed.). Dictionary of scientific biography. Vol. 9. New York: C. Scribner's sons. pp. 72–74. ISBN 0684101203. Archived from the original on 17 November 2010.
- Phillips, F. C. (1957). An introduction to crystallography (2nd ed.). London New York Toronto: Longmans, Green & Co.
- Pope, W. J. (December 1935). "William Barlow, 1845-1934". Obituary Notices of Fellows of the Royal Society. 1 (4): 367–370. doi:10.1098/rsbm.1935.0001.
- "Pyroelectricity". Online Dictionary of Crystallography. International Union of Crystallography. 17 November 2017.
- Ramberg, Peter J. (2003). Chemical structure, spatial arrangement: the early history of stereochemistry, 1874-1914. Aldershot, England; Burlington, VT: Ashgate. ISBN 0-7546-0397-0.
- Richardson, George M., ed. (1901). The Foundations of Stereochemistry: Memoirs by Pasteur, Van't Hoff, Lebel, and Wislicenus. New York; Cincinnati; Chicago: American Book Company.
- Riddell, F. G.; Robinson, M. J. T. (January 1974). "J. H. van't Hoff and J. A. Le Bel—their historical context". Tetrahedron. 30 (13): 2001–2007. doi:10.1016/S0040-4020(01)97330-2.
- Robertson, Edmund F.; O'Connor, John J. "The MacTutor History of Mathematics Archive: Biographies". School of Mathematics and Statistics, University of St Andrews.
- Robertson, John H. (1 May 1992). "Historical atlas of crystallography edited by J. Lima-de-Faria". Acta Crystallographica Section A: Foundations of Crystallography (review). 48 (3): 405–406. Bibcode:1992AcCrA..48..405R. doi:10.1107/S0108767392000801.
- Rocke, Alan J. (September 1977). "Crystals and Compounds: Molecular Structure and Composition in Nineteenth-Century French Science. Seymour H. Mauskopf". Isis (review). 68 (3): 493–494. doi:10.1086/351864.
- Rocke, Alan J. (2010). "Dimensional Molecules". Image and reality: Kekulé, Kopp, and the scientific imagination. Chicago: The University of Chicago Press. pp. 228–260. ISBN 978-0-226-72332-7.
- Romé de l'Isle, Jean Baptiste Louis de (1783). Cristallographie (in French). Paris: De l'imprimerie de Monsieur.
- S., W. A. (October 1968). "Reviews". Ambix (review). 15 (3): 209–210. doi:10.1179/amb.1968.15.3.209.
- Salvia, Stefano (August 2013). "Emil Wohlwill's "Entdeckung des Isomorphismus": A Nineteenth-Century "Material Biography" of Crystallography". Ambix. 60 (3): 255–284. doi:10.1179/0002698013Z.00000000033.
- Sarton, George (January 1932). "Discovery of Conical Refraction by William Rowan Hamilton and Humphrey Lloyd (1833)". Isis. 17 (1): 154–170. doi:10.1086/346641. ISSN 0021-1753. "I know of no person who has not seen conical refraction that really believed in it. I have myself converted a score of mathematicians by showing them the cone of light". Hamilton replied, "How different from me! If I had seen it only, I should not have believed it. My eyes have too often deceived me. I believe it, because I have proved it"
- Scherz, Gustav (1981). "Stensen, Niels". In Gillispie, Charles Coulston (ed.). Dictionary of scientific biography. Vol. 13. New York: Charles Scribner's Sons. pp. 30–35. ISBN 068416969X. Archived from the original on 11 October 2019.
- Schlote, K.-H. (January 1991). "Symmetrie Gruppe Dualität. Science Networks – Historical Studies Bd. 1". Zeitschrift für Kristallographie (review) (in German). 194 (1–2): 154–156. Bibcode:1991ZK....194..154S. doi:10.1524/zkri.1991.194.1-2.154.
- Schneer, Cecil (December 1960). "Kepler's New Year's Gift of a Snowflake". Isis. 51 (4): 531–545. doi:10.1086/349411. JSTOR 228611.
- Scholz, Erhard (1989a). Symmetrie, Gruppe, Dualität [Symmetry, group, duality] (PDF) (in German). Basel Boston Berlin: Birkhäuser. ISBN 3764319747.
- Scholz, Erhard (1989b). "Crystallographic Symmetry Concepts and Group Theory (1850-1860)". In Rowe, David E.; McCleary, John (eds.). The history of modern mathematics: proceedings of the Symposium on the history of modern mathematics, Vassar college, Poughkeepsie, New York, June 20-24, 1988. New York London Toronto: Academic Press. pp. 3–27. ISBN 0125996624.
- Scholz, Erhard (1989c). "The rise of Symmetry Concepts in the Atomistic and Dynamistic Schools of Crystallography, 1815-1830". Revue d'histoire des sciences. 42 (1–2): 109–122. doi:10.3406/rhs.1989.4136.
- Scholz, Erhard (1996). "The Influence of Justus Grassmann's Crystallographic Works on Hermann Grassmann". In Schubring, G. (ed.). Hermann Günther Graßmann (1809–1877): Visionary Mathematician, Scientist and Neohumanist Scholar. Boston Studies in the Philosophy of Science. Vol. 187. pp. 37–45. doi:10.1007/978-94-015-8753-2_5. ISBN 978-94-015-8753-2.
- Schuh, Curtis P. (2007a). Mineralogy & Crystallography: On the History of these Sciences through 1919. Curtis Schuh.
- Schuh, Curtis P. (2007b). Mineralogy and Crystallography: An Annotated Biobibliography of Books Published 1469 to 1919. Vol. 1. Archived from the original on 25 August 2007.
- Schuh, Curtis P. (2007c). Mineralogy and Crystallography: An Annotated Biobibliography of Books Published 1469 to 1919. Vol. 2. Archived from the original on 25 August 2007.
- Schuh, Curtis (2013). "Liebisch, Theodor". Biobibliography of Mineralogy. The Mineralogical Record. Archived from the original on 26 March 2013.
- Schütt, Hans-Werner (1984). Die Entdeckung des Isomorphismus: eine Fallstudie zur Geschichte der Mineralogie und der Chemie [The discovery of isomorphism: a case study in the history of mineralogy and chemistry] (in German). Hildesheim: Gerstenberg Verlag. ISBN 3-8067-0902-5.
- Schütt, Hans-Werner (1997). Eilhard Mitscherlich: prince of Prussian chemistry. Washington, DC: American Chemical Society and the Chemical Heritage Foundation. ISBN 0-8412-3345-4.
- Schwarzenbach, Dieter (January 2012). "The success story of crystallography" (PDF). Acta Crystallographica A. 68 (1): 57–67. Bibcode:2012AcCrA..68...57S. doi:10.1107/S0108767311030303. PMID 22186283.
- Schwarzenbach, Dieter (3 April 2014). "Early days of x-ray crystallography". Crystallography Reviews (review). 20 (2): 155–156. Bibcode:2014CryRv..20..155S. doi:10.1080/0889311x.2013.876419.
- Science History Institute (June 2016). "Justus von Liebig and Friedrich Wöhler". sciencehistory.org.
- Senechal, Marjorie (1990a). Crystalline symmetries: an informal mathematical introduction. Bristol; Philadelphia: Adam Hilger. pp. 2–8. ISBN 9780750300414.
- Senechal, Marjorie (1990b). "Brief history of geometrical crystallography". In Lima-de-Faria, J. (ed.). Historical atlas of crystallography. Dordrecht; Boston: Published for International Union of Crystallography by Kluwer Academic Publishers. pp. 43–59. ISBN 079230649X.
- Shafranovskii, I. I. (1978). The History of Crystallography: From Ancient Times to the Beginning of the Nineteenth Century (in Russian). Vol. 1. Leningrad: Nauka.
- Shafranovskii, I. I. (1980). The History of Crystallography: The Nineteenth Century (in Russian). Vol. 2. Leningrad: Nauka.
- Shafranovskii, I. I.; Belov, N. V. (1962). "E. S. Fedorov". In Ewald, P. P. (ed.). 50 Years of X-Ray Diffraction. Utrecht: Published for International Union of Crystallography by N. V. A. Oosthoek's Uitgeversmaatschappij. pp. 341–351.
- Shenstone, William Ashwell (1901). Justus von Liebig, his life and work (1803-1873). London: Cassell.
- Shinn, Terry (2013). "The silicon tide". In Buchwald, Jed Z.; Fox, Robert (eds.). The Oxford handbook of the history of physics (First ed.). Oxford; New York, NY: Oxford University Press. p. 868. ISBN 978-0-19-969625-3. "Much pre-twentieth-century study of crystals focused on their geometry, and mathematical description became increasingly central. There was then little reflection on the mechanical, optical, and electrical properties of crystals. This changed early in the twentieth century ..."
- Shtukenberg, A. G.; Punin, Yurii O. (2007). Kahr, Bart (ed.). Optically anomalous crystals. Dordrecht: Springer. ISBN 978-1-4020-5287-3.
- Shubnikov, A. V. (1969). "Evgraf Stepanovich Fedorov (50th anniversary of his death)". Soviet Physics Crystallography. 14 (3): 319–322.
- Shubnikov, A. V. (1988). "On the works of Pierre Curie on symmetry". Computers & Mathematics with Applications. 16 (5–8): 357–364. doi:10.1016/0898-1221(88)90225-8.
- Shubnikov, A. V.; Kopt︠s︡ik, V. A. (1974). Harker, David (ed.). Symmetry in science and art. Translated by Archard, G. D. New York: Plenum Press. ISBN 0-306-30759-6.
- Simonyi, Károly (2012). A cultural history of physics. Translated by Kramer, David. Boca Raton: CRC press. ISBN 978-1-56881-329-5.
- Sluckin, Tim; Dunmur, David; Stegemeyer, H. (2022). Crystals that flow: classic papers from the history of liquid crystals (eBook ed.). Boca Raton: CRC Press, Taylor & Francis Group. ISBN 9780415257893.
- Smeaton, W. A. (1970). "Bergman, Torbern Olof". In Gillispie, Charles Coulston (ed.). Dictionary of scientific biography. Vol. 2. New York: Scribner. pp. 4–8. ISBN 0684169630. Archived from the original on 16 November 2010.
- "Sohncke groups". Online Dictionary of Crystallography. International Union of Crystallography. 3 April 2019.
- Sorby, H. C. (2 January 1858). "On the microscopical structure of crystals indicating the origin of minerals and rocks". Quarterly Journal of the Geological Society. 14 (1–2): 453–500. Bibcode:1858QJGS...14..453S. doi:10.1144/GSL.JGS.1858.014.01-02.44. S2CID 128592719.
- Spencer, Leonard James (1910). "Crystallography". Encyclopedia Britannica. Vol. 7 (11th ed.). New York: Cambridge University. p. 570.
- Stillwell, Charles W. (1938). Crystal chemistry. New York and London: McGraw-Hill Book Company.
- Swartz, C. K. (1 January 1909). "Proposed classification of crystals based on the recognition of seven fundamental types of symmetry". Geological Society of America Bulletin. 20 (1): 369–398. Bibcode:1909GSAB...20..369S. doi:10.1130/gsab-20-369.
- Szabadváry, F. (1974). "Mitscherlich, Eilhard". In Gillispie, Charles Coulston (ed.). Dictionary of scientific biography. Vol. 9. New York: C. Scribner's sons. pp. 423–426. ISBN 0684101203. Archived from the original on 17 November 2010.
- Szpiro, George (2003). Kepler's conjecture: how some of the greatest minds in history helped solve one of the oldest math problems in the world. Hoboken, N.J: John Wiley & Sons. ISBN 9780471086017.
- Tandy, Peter (January 2004). "William Barlow (1845–1934): Speculative builder, man of leisure and inspired crystallographer". Proceedings of the Geologists' Association. 115 (1): 77–84. Bibcode:2004PrGA..115...77T. doi:10.1016/s0016-7878(76)80049-1.
- Taylor, Kenneth L. (1978). "Delafosse, Gabriel". In Gillispie, Charles Coulston (ed.). Dictionary of scientific biography: Topical essays. Vol. 15 (Supplement 1). New York: C. Scribner's sons. pp. 114–115. ISBN 0684147793. Archived from the original on 19 September 2020.
- Terpstra, P.; Codd, W. L. (1961). Crystallometry. London: Longmans. pp. 335–372.
- "The Evolution of the Goniometer". Nature. 95 (2386): 564–565. 1 July 1915. Bibcode:1915Natur..95..564.. doi:10.1038/095564a0. ISSN 1476-4687.
- Thomson, William (1904). "On the molecular tactics of a crystal". Baltimore Lectures on Molecular Dynamics and the Wave Theory of Light. London: C. J. Clay and Sons. pp. 602–642. "I call any geometric figure, or group of points, chiral and say it has chirality if its image in a plane mirror cannot be brought to coincide with itself."
- Threlfall, T. (2003). "Structural and thermodynamic explanations of Ostwald's Rule". Organic Process Research & Development. 7 (6): 1017–1027. doi:10.1021/op030026l. ISSN 1083-6160.
- Tomisaka, T. (1988). "The progress of crystallography and related sciences from early nineteenth to middle twentieth century". Journal of the Mineralogical Society of Japan (in Japanese). 18 (5): 311–320. doi:10.2465/gkk1952.18.311.
- Touret, Lydie (2004). "Crystal model: milestone in the birth of crystallography and mineralogy as sciences". In Visser, Robert Paul Willem; Touret, Jacques L. R. (eds.). Dutch pioneers of the earth sciences. Amsterdam: Koninklijke Nederlandse Akademie van Wetenschappen. pp. 43–58. ISBN 90-6984-389-7.
- Tutton, A. E. H. (1922a). Crystallography and practical crystal measurement. Vol. 1: Form and Structure (2nd ed.). London: Macmillan & Co.
- Tutton, A. E. H. (1922b). Crystallography and practical crystal measurement. Vol. 2: Physical and Chemical (2nd ed.). London: Macmillan & Co.
- Usselman, Melvyn C. (1986). "The Reflective Goniometer and its Impact on Chemical Theory". In Stock, J. T.; Orna, M. V. (eds.). The History and Preservation of Chemical Instrumentation. pp. 33–40. doi:10.1007/978-94-009-4690-3_4. ISBN 978-94-010-8585-4.
- Usselman, Melvyn C. (2015). Pure intelligence: the life of William Hyde Wollaston. Chicago; London: The University of Chicago Press. ISBN 9780226245737.
- Valeur, Bernard; Berberan-Santos, Mário N. (1 June 2011). "A Brief History of Fluorescence and Phosphorescence before the Emergence of Quantum Theory". Journal of Chemical Education. 88 (6): 731–738. Bibcode:2011JChEd..88..731V. doi:10.1021/ed100182h.
- Van Stanten, R. A. (1 November 1984). "The Ostwald step rule" (PDF). Journal of Physical Chemistry. 88 (24): 5768–5769. Bibcode:1984JPhCh..88.5768V. doi:10.1021/j150668a002.
- Viterbo, Davide (January 2014). "Early Days of X-ray Crystallography". Chemistry International (review). 36 (3). doi:10.1515/ci.2014.36.3.21.
- Voigt, W. (1913). "Nachruf für Prof. Dr. Friedrich Pockels" [Obituary for Prof. Dr. Friedrich Pockels]. Beiblatter zu den Annalen der Physik (in German). 37 (19): S.I–S.IV.
- Wahl, Walter (2 June 1913). "The relation between the crystal-symmetry of the simpler organic compounds and their molecular constitution.—Part I". Proceedings of the Royal Society of London. Series A, Containing Papers of a Mathematical and Physical Character. 88 (604): 354–361. Bibcode:1913RSPSA..88..354W. doi:10.1098/rspa.1913.0036. JSTOR 93436.
- Weber, P. X. (1915). "Dr. Moritz Anton Kappeller, 1685-1769". Der Geschichtsfreund. Mitteilungen des Historischen vereins der funf Orte Lucern, Uri, Schweiz, Unterwalden und Zug (in German). 70: 157–249. doi:10.5169/seals-117324.
- Westfall, Richard S. (1972). "Hooke, Robert". In Gillispie, Charles Coulston (ed.). Dictionary of scientific biography. Vol. 6. New York: Scribner. pp. 481–488. ISBN 0684101173. Archived from the original on 11 August 2021.
- The life and work of John Tyndall: with personal reminiscences by friends, and numerous illustrations. London: Westminster Gazette. 1893. p. 6.
- Whewell, William (2011) [1837]. "History of mineralogy". History of the Inductive Sciences: From the Earliest to the Present Times. Cambridge: Cambridge University Press. pp. 191–235. doi:10.1017/CBO9780511734359. ISBN 978-1-108-01926-2.
- Whewell, William (2011) [1837]. "Prelude to the Epoch of De L'Isle and Haüy". History of the Inductive Sciences: From the Earliest to the Present Times (Online ed.). Cambridge: Cambridge University Press. pp. 191–197. doi:10.1017/cbo9780511734359.027. ISBN 978-1-108-01926-2. "Nevertheless since there is here a principle of crystallization, the inclination of the planes and of the angles is always constant."
- Whitlock, Herbert P. (1934). "A century of progress in crystallography" (PDF). American Mineralogist. 19 (3): 93–100.
- Wigner, E. P. (September 1968). "Symmetry Principles in Old and New Physics" (PDF). Bulletin of the American Mathematical Society. 74 (5): 793–815. doi:10.1090/S0002-9904-1968-12047-6.
- "Wilhelm Ostwald Biographical". nobelprize.org. Nobel Media AB.
- Williams, L. Pearce (October 1977). "Crystals and Compounds: Molecular Structure and Composition in Nineteenth-Century French Science". The American Historical Review (review). 82 (4): 983. doi:10.2307/1865207. JSTOR 1865207.
- Wilson, Wendell E. "Curtis Schuh's Annotated Bio-Bibliography of Mineralogy". The Mineralogical Record.
- Wollaston, William Hyde (1809). "Description of a reflective goniometer". Philosophical Transactions of the Royal Society of London. 99: 253–258. doi:10.1098/rstl.1809.0018.
- Wood, Elizabeth. A. (1 October 1967). "Origins of the Science of Crystals". American Journal of Physics (review). 35 (10): 979–980. Bibcode:1967AmJPh..35R.979B. doi:10.1119/1.1973687.
- Wooster, W. A. (1990). "Brief history of physical crystallography". In Lima-de-Faria, J. (ed.). Historical atlas of crystallography. Dordrecht; Boston: Published for International Union of Crystallography by Kluwer Academic Publishers. pp. 61–75. ISBN 079230649X.
- Wyart, Jean (1971). "Curie, Pierre". In Gillispie, Charles Coulston (ed.). Dictionary of scientific biography. Vol. 3. New York: Scribner. pp. 503–508. ISBN 0684169649. Archived from the original on 23 February 2024.
