= Pockels =

Pockels is a surname. Notable people with the surname include:

- Agnes Pockels (1862–1935), German chemist
- Friedrich Carl Alwin Pockels (1865–1913), German physicist
