= Theodor Liebisch =

German mineralogist and crystallographer (1852–1922)

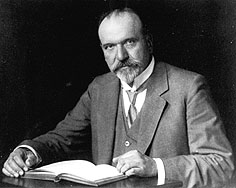
Liebisch's Portrait

Theodor Liebisch (29 April 1852, Breslau – 9 February 1922, Berlin) was a German mineralogist and crystallographer.

== Biography ==
In 1874 he received his doctorate from the University of Breslau, then worked as an assistant to Gerhard vom Rath at the University of Bonn. After several years spent as a curator at the mineralogical museum of the University of Berlin, he became an associate professor of mineralogy at Breslau (1880). Afterwards he successively served as a full professor of mineralogy at the universities of Greifswald (1883/84), Königsberg (from 1884), Göttingen (1887–1909) and Berlin (1909–22). He was an editor of the periodical "Jahrbuch für Mineralogie, Geologie und Paläontologie".

His name is associated with "Liebisch twinning", a complex type of crystal twinning that is a combination of the Dauphiné and Brazil twinning laws.

== Principal works ==
- Geometrische krystallographie, 1881 – Geometric crystallography.
- Physikalische krystallographie, 1891 – Physical crystallography.
- Grundriss der physikalischen Krystallographie, 1896 – Outline of physical crystallography.
- Die synthese der mineralien und gesteine, 1901 – The synthesis of minerals and rocks.

== See also ==
- Physical crystallography before X-rays
