= Andreas Artsruni =

Armenian-Russian mineralogist and geologist (1847–1898)

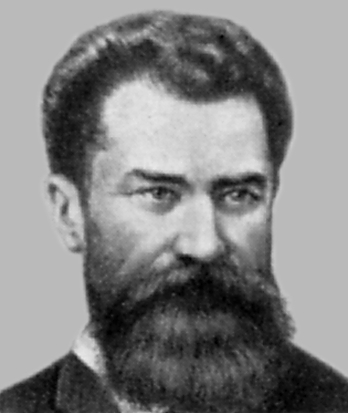
Andreas Artsruni

Andreas (Andrei) Eremeevich Arzruni (Armenian: Անդրեաս (Անդրեյ) Երեմիայի Արծրունի; 27 November (9 December) 1847 in Moscow – 10 (22) September 1898 in Hohenhonof, Germany) was an Armenian-Russian mineralogist and geologist. He was Grigor Artsruni's brother.

== Works ==
- Beziehungen zwischen physikalischen Eigenschaften und chemischer Zusammensetzung der Korper (in German). Vol. 3. Braunschweig: Vieweg und Sohn. 1898.
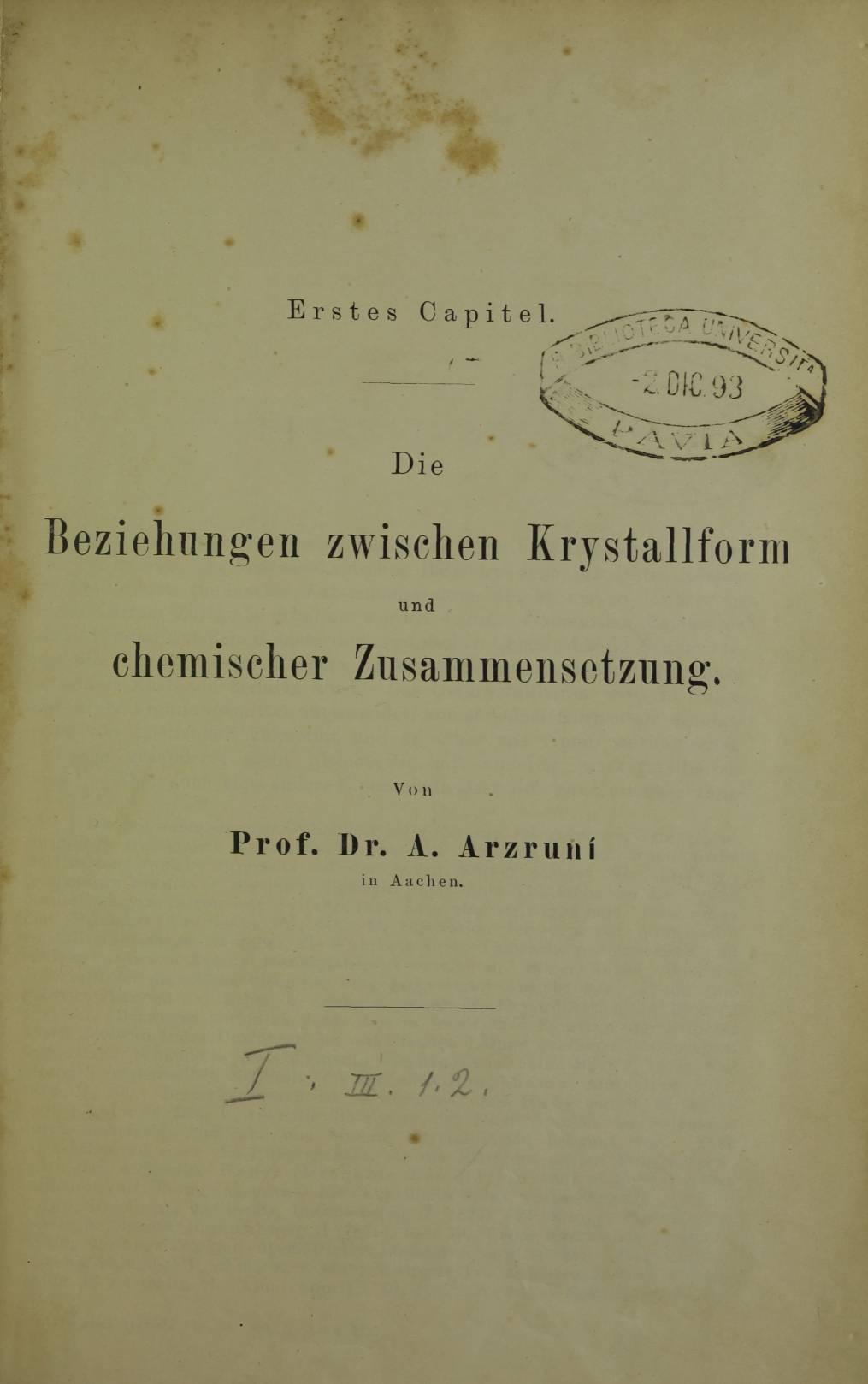
Beziehungen zwischen physikalischen Eigenschaften und chemischer Zusammensetzung der Korper, 1898

== See also ==
- Chemical crystallography before X-rays
