= Friedrich Carl Alwin Pockels =

German physicist (1865–1913)

Friedrich Carl Alwin Pockels (18 June 1865 – 29 August 1913) was a German physicist. He was born in Italy to Captain Theodore Pockels and Alwine Becker. He obtained a doctorate from the University of Göttingen in 1888, and from 1900 to 1913 he was professor of theoretical physics at the University of Heidelberg.

Pockels studied under the guidance of Woldemar Voigt, who was a physicist working on the general phenomena of piezoelectricity and pyroelectricity. In 1890, Pockels developed a general theory of electro-optics. In 1893 he discovered that a steady electric field applied to certain birefringent materials causes the refractive index to vary, approximately in proportion to the strength of the field. The coefficient of proportionality is of the order of 10×10^{−10} V^{−1} to 10×10^{−12} V^{−1}. This phenomenon is now called the Pockels effect.

Pockels was awarded the prize of the Heidelberg Jubilee Foundation for the Encouragement of Scientific Research in 1906.

His sister Agnes Pockels (1862–1935) was a pioneer in chemistry.

== See also ==
- Photoelasticity
- Physical crystallography before X-rays
