= Otto Lehmann (physicist) =

German physicist (1855 - 1922)

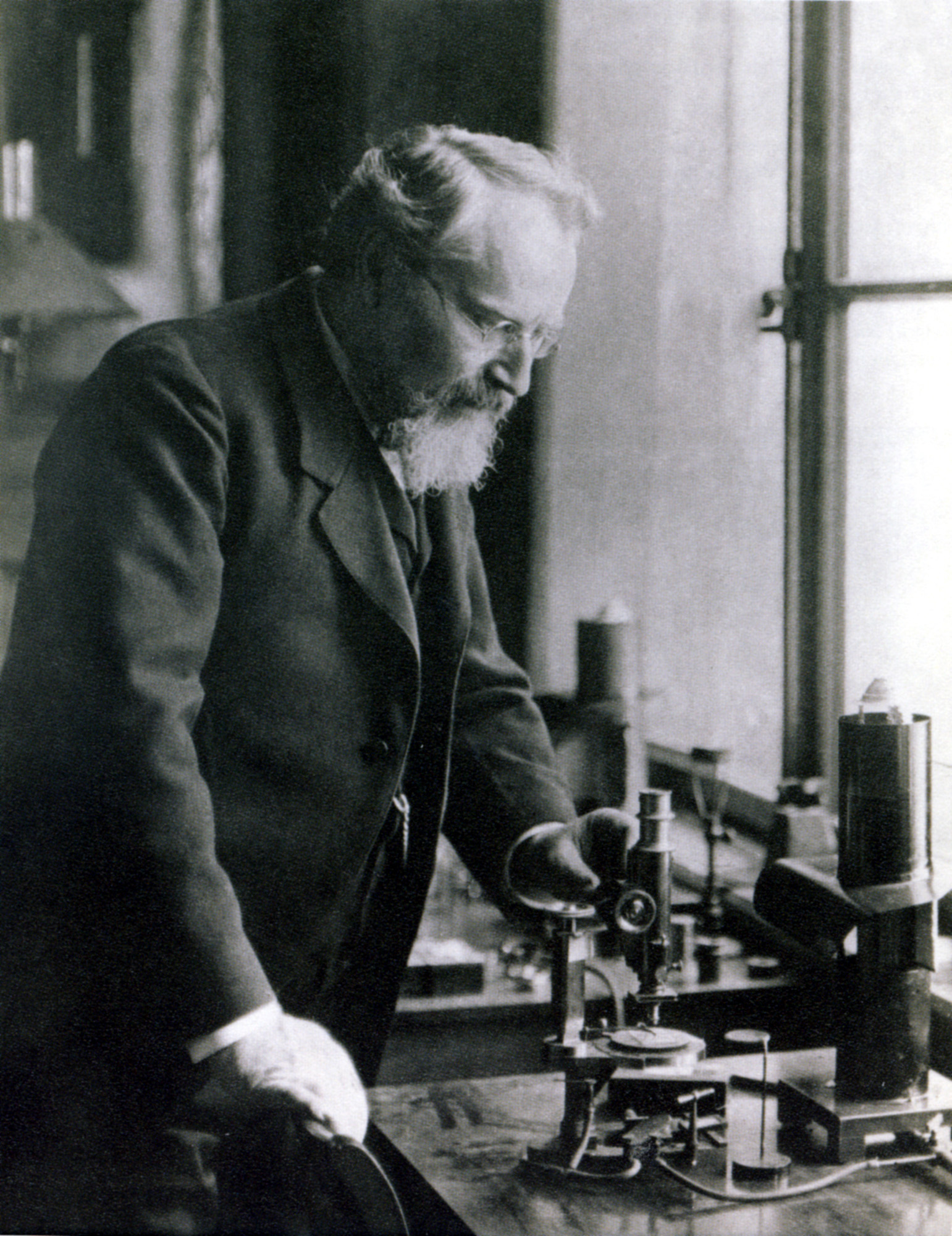
- Born: 13 January 1855; Konstanz, Grand Duchy of Baden
- Died: 17 June 1922 (aged 67); Karlsruhe, Germany
- Citizenship: German
- Education: University of Strassburg
- Known for: Flowing crystals
- Scientific career
- Fields: Physics
- Workplaces: Aachen & Karlsruhe
- Doctoral advisor: Paul Heinrich von Groth

Otto Lehmann (13 January 1855 in Konstanz – 17 June 1922 in Karlsruhe) was a German physicist and "father" of liquid crystal.

== Life ==
Otto was the son of Franz Xavier Lehmann, a mathematics teacher in the Baden-Wurtemberg school system, with a strong interest in microscopes. Otto learned to experiment and keep records of this findings. Between 1872 and 1877, Lehmann studied natural sciences at the University of Strassburg and obtained the Ph.D. under crystallographer Paul Groth. Otto used polarizers in a microscope so that he might watch for birefringence appearing in the process of crystallization.

Initially becoming a school teacher for physics, mathematics and chemistry in Mülhausen (Alsace-Lorraine), he started university teaching at the RWTH Aachen University in 1883. In 1889, he succeeded Heinrich Hertz as head of the Institute of Physics in Karlsruhe.

Lehmann received a letter from Friedrich Reinitzer asking for confirmation of some unusual observations.

It was Lehmann's jealously guarded and increasingly prestigious microscope, not yet available off the shelf, which had attracted Reinitzer's attention. With Reinitzer's peculiar double-melting liquid, a problem in search of a scientist had met a scientist in search of a problem. (Dunmur & Sluckin 2011)

The article "On Flowing Crystals" that Lehmann wrote for Zeitschrift für Physikalische Chemie addresses directly the question of phase of matter involved, and leaves in its wake the science of liquid crystals.

Lehmann was an unsuccessful nominee for a Nobel Prize from 1913 to 1922.

== Work ==
- Selbstanfertigung physikalischer Apparate. Leipzig 1885.
- Molekularphysik (i.e. Molecular physics). 2 Bde, Leipzig 1888/89.
- Die Kristallanalyse (i.e. The Analysis of Crystals). Leipzig 1891.
- Elektricität und Licht (i.e. Electricity and Light). Braunschweig 1895.
- Flüssige Krystalle (i.e. Liquid Crystals). Leipzig 1904.
- Die scheinbar lebenden Krystalle. Eßlingen 1907.
- Die wichtigsten Begriffe und Gesetze der Physik. Berlin 1907.
- Flüssige Kristalle und ihr scheinbares Leben. Forschungsergebnisse dargestellt in einem Kinofilm. Voss, Leipzig 1921.

== See also ==
- Chemical crystallography before X-rays
