= Mitscherlich's law =

Mitscherlich's law can refer to:

- Mitscherlich's law of isomorphism, which predicts which chemical compounds have the same crystal structures
- Mitscherlich's law of physiological relations, which predicts that crop yields are related to the amount of plant food available
