= Chemical crystallography before X-rays =

History of chemical crystallography to 1895

Chemical crystallography before X-rays describes how chemical crystallography developed as a science up to the discovery of X-rays by Wilhelm Conrad Röntgen in 1895. In the period before X-rays, crystallography can be divided into three broad areas: geometrical crystallography culminating in the discovery of the 230 space groups in 1891–1894, physical crystallography and chemical crystallography.

Up until 1800 neither crystallography nor chemistry were established sciences in the modern sense; as the 19th century progressed both sciences developed in parallel. In the 18th century chemistry was in a transitional period as it moved from the mystical and philosophical approach of the alchemists, to the experimental and logical approach of the scientific chemists such as Antoine Lavoisier, Humphry Davy and John Dalton.

Before X-rays, chemical crystallographic research involved observation using a goniometer, a microscope, and reference to crystal classes, tables of crystal angles, axial ratios, and the ratio between molecular weight and density (M/ρ). In this period crystallography was a science supported by empirical laws (law of constancy of interfacial angles, law of rational indices, law of symmetry) based on observations rather than theory.

The history of chemical crystallography covers a broad range of topics including isomorphism, polymorphism, molecular chirality and the interaction with mineralogy, structural chemistry and solid-state physics.

== Symmetry ==
During the 19th century crystallography was progressively transformed into an empirical and mathematical science by the adoption of symmetry concepts. In 1832 Franz Ernst Neumann used symmetry considerations when studying double refraction in crystals. Woldemar Voigt, who was a student of Neumann, in 1885 formalized Neumann's principle as "if a crystal is invariant with respect to certain symmetry operations, any of its physical properties must also be invariant with respect to the same symmetry operations". Neumann's principle is sometimes referred to as the Neumann–Minnigerode–Curie principle based on later work by Bernhard Minnigerode (another student of Neumann) and Pierre Curie. Curie's principle "the symmetries of the causes are to be found in the effects" is a generalization of Neumann's principle.

The relations between symmetry and physical and chemical properties were established throughout the 19th century: the notion of hemihedry (Weiss, 1819; Delafosse, 1840), the 7 crystal systems (Mohs, 1822), the notion of point lattice (Seeber, 1824), the 32 crystal classes (Frankenheim, 1826; Hessel, 1830; Gadolin, 1869), molecular chirality (Pasteur, 1848), the 14 Bravais lattices (Bravais, 1850), the 65 chiral groups that contain only proper symmetry operations – rotations, translations and roto-translations (Sohncke 1879), and, finally, the 230 space groups (Fedorov, 1891; Schoenflies, 1891; Barlow, 1894).

== 16th century ==
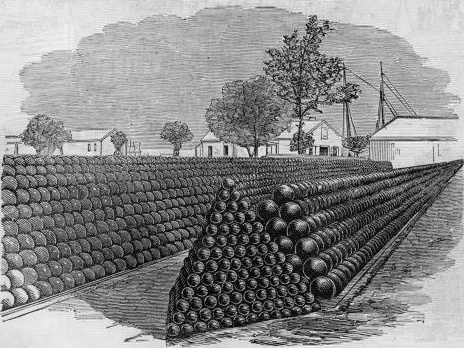
Cannonballs piled on a triangular (front) and rectangular (back) base, both face-centered cubic lattices.

In the first half of the 16th century Paracelsus proposed a theory of mineral formation as an analogy to fruit-bearing plants. In 1550 Gerolamo Cardano made an early attempt to explain the shape of crystals as the result of a close packing of spheres. In 1591 Thomas Harriot studied the close packing of cannonballs (spheres). In 1597 Andreas Libavius recognized the geometrical characteristics of crystals and identified salts from their crystal shape.

== 17th century ==
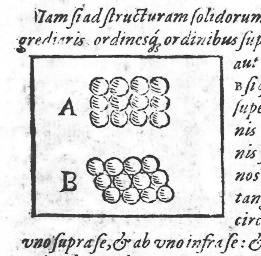
Drawing by Kepler (1611) of square (A) and hexagonal (B) packings

Cleavage planes in a crystal of Iceland spar (Huygens, 1690)

In 1611 Johannes Kepler studied the packing of spheres, in order to explain the hexagonal symmetry of snow crystals. Kepler demonstrated that in a compact packing each sphere has six neighbours in the same plane, three in the plane above, and three in the plane below, for a total of twelve touching spheres. Kepler concluded that π/(3√2) = 0.74084 is the maximum possible density amongst any arrangement of spheres — this became known as the Kepler conjecture. The conjecture was finally proved by Thomas Hales in 1998.

By the second half of the 17th century the ideas of Paracelsus had been displaced by a more scientific approach to chemistry, geology, mineralogy, and the emerging field of crystallography. In his book The Sceptical Chymist of 1661, Robert Boyle criticized the traditional composition of materials, as represented by the teaching of Aristotle and Paracelsus, and initiated the modern understanding of chemical elements using the words "perfectly unmingled bodies". Boyle argued that matter's basic elements consisted of various types of particles, termed "corpuscles", which were capable of arranging themselves into groups (molecules). Boyle was one of the earliest researchers to use the term crystal for crystalline substances apart from quartz. In 1665 Robert Hooke attempted to explain crystal morphology based on the stacking of atoms. In his work Micrographia he reported on the regularity of quartz crystals observed with the recently invented microscope, and proposed that they are formed by spherules.

Nicolas Steno rejected Paracelsus's proposed organic origin for crystals. Steno first observed the law of constancy of interfacial angles when studying quartz crystals (De solido intra solidum naturaliter contento, Florence, 1669), and noted that, although the crystals of a substance differed in appearance from one to another, the angles between corresponding faces were always the same. Steno's work can be considered as the beginning of crystallography as an independent discipline.

In 1678 Christiaan Huygens proposed a structural explanation of the double refraction of calcite based on ellipsoidal atoms. Huygens discovered the polarization of light by Iceland spar, a transparent form of calcite, and published his results in his Traité de la Lumière.

Domenico Guglielmini's publications of 1688 (Riflessioni filosofiche dedotte dalle figure de Sali) and 1705 (De salibus dissertatio epistolaris physico-medico-mechanica) concluded that the earliest forms (he noted cube, rhombohedral parallelepiped, hexagonal prism, and octahedron) of various salt crystals are characteristic of each substance, are identical in form, indivisible, and have faces with identical inclinations to each other.

== 18th century ==
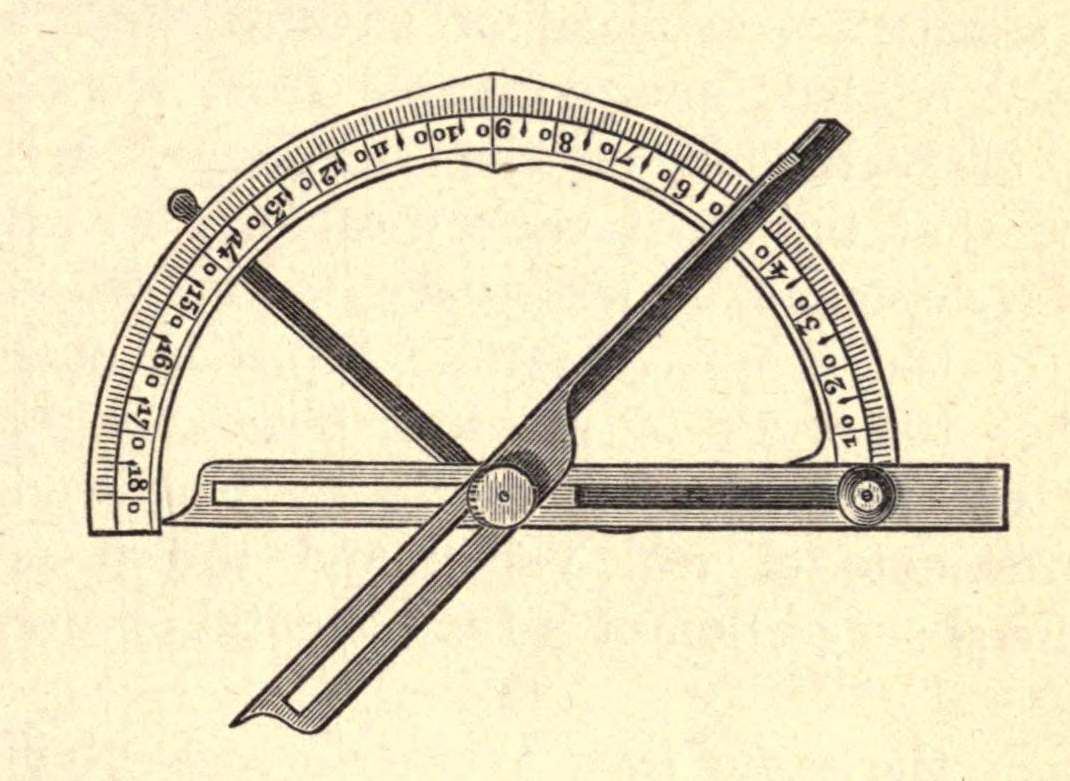
Contact goniometer of the Carangeot type

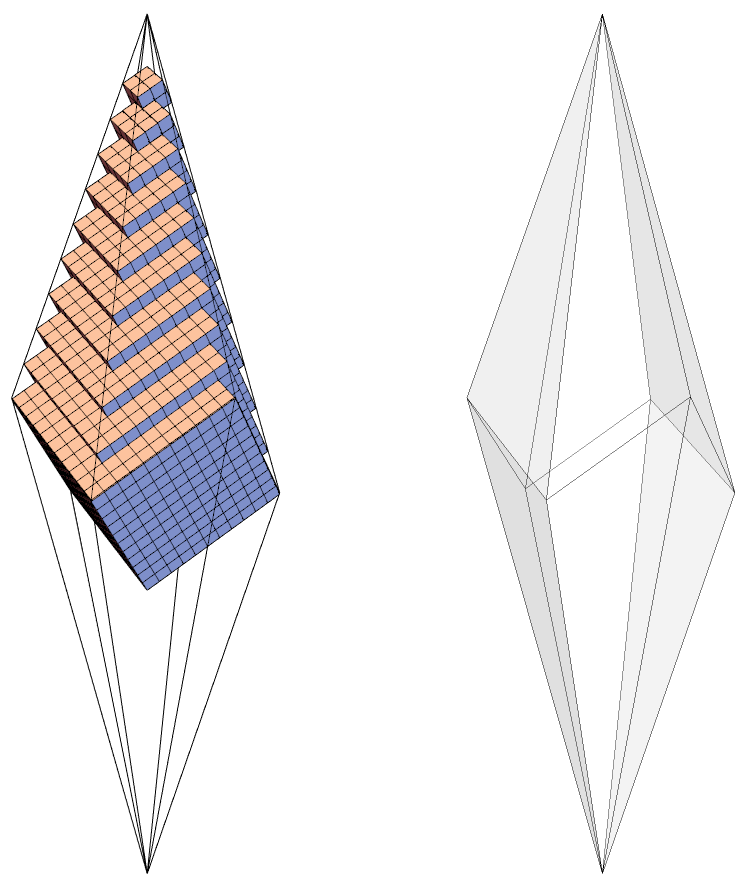
Calcite scalenohedron crystal constructed from small building blocks (molécules intégrantes) using the law of decrements of René Just Haüy.

In 1723 Moritz Anton Cappeller published Prodromus Crystallographiae, the first treatise on crystal shapes. The introduction of the term crystallography is attributed to Cappeller. In 1735 Carl Linnaeus, who is known for his system of classification of biological species in his Systema Naturae, also classified minerals and stated that "their transparency is derived from their atomical construction". In 1745 Guillaume-François Rouelle carried out a microscopic analysis of sea salt and proposed that the crystals were composed of cubic particles. In 1758 Roger Joseph Boscovich published his atomic theory which stated that particles of matter were linked by attractive and repulsive forces and that the solid so formed was compressible rather than rigid; this would become relevant in the 19th century when Haüy theorised that crystals were constructed from identical units stacked up without spaces.

The idea of a polyhedral molecular unit of crystal structure was promoted by Pierre-Joseph Macquer in his handbook Dictionnaire de chymie of 1766. In 1767 Christian Friedrich Gotthard Westfeld wrote that calcite crystals could be built from rhombohedra. In 1773 Torbern Bergman, a leader in the field of chemical analysis, described the crystal forms of calcite and stated that all the forms could be built up from the cleavage rhombohedron. Bergman developed a classification of minerals based on chemical characteristics (extending the work of Linnaeus), with subclasses organized by their external shapes, and defined seven primary crystal forms.

With Jean-Baptiste L. Romé de l'Isle's Essai de cristallographie published in 1772 and Cristallographie published in 1783 the scientific approach to crystal structure began. Romé de l'Isle described over 500 crystal forms and accurately measured the interfacial angles of a great variety of crystals, using the goniometer designed by his student Arnould Carangeot. Romé de l'Isle noted that the angles are characteristic of a substance, thus generalizing the law of constancy of angles postulated by Steno. Romé de l'Isle considered that the shape of a crystal is a consequence of the packing of elemental particles, and defined six primitive forms.

In 1781 René Just Haüy (often termed the "Father of Modern Crystallography") discovered that crystals always cleave along crystallographic planes. Based on this observation, and the fact that the inter-facial angles in each crystal species always have the same value, Haüy concluded that crystals must be periodic and composed of regularly arranged layers of tiny polyhedra (molécules intégrantes). This theory explained why all crystal planes are related by small rational numbers (the law of rational indices). In 1784 René-Just Haüy published Essai d'une théorie sur la structure des cristaux, appliquée à plusieurs genres de substances cristallisées in which he stated his law of decrements: a crystal is composed of molecules arranged periodically in three dimensions without leaving any gaps. Haüy's molecular crystal structure theory assumed that molécules intégrantes were specific in shape and composition for every compound. Haüy developed a mathematical theory of crystal structure that turned out to be remarkably accurate and gave crystallography a legitimate place among the sciences.

== Early 19th century ==
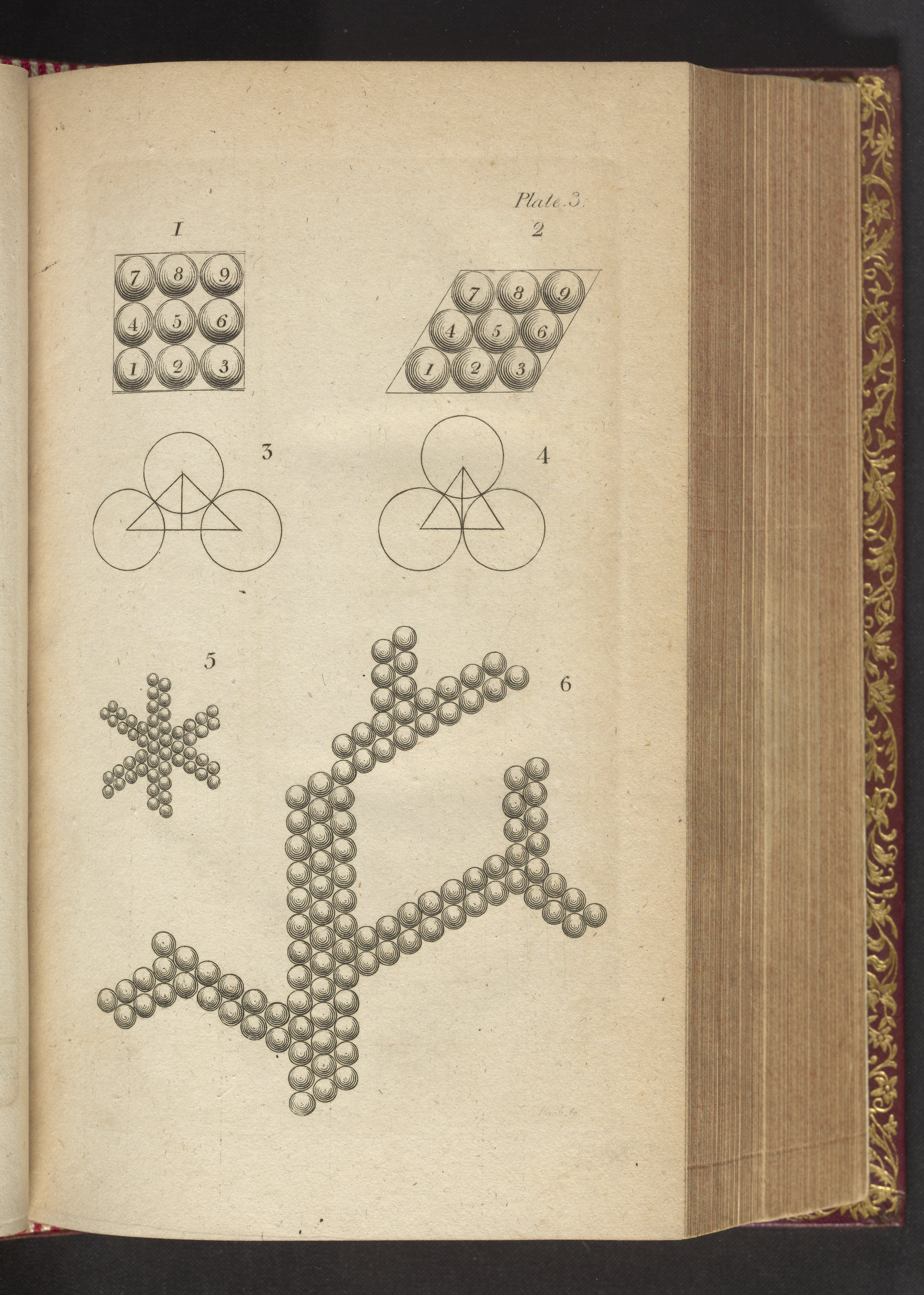
Possible ice structures constructed from spheres (Dalton, 1808).

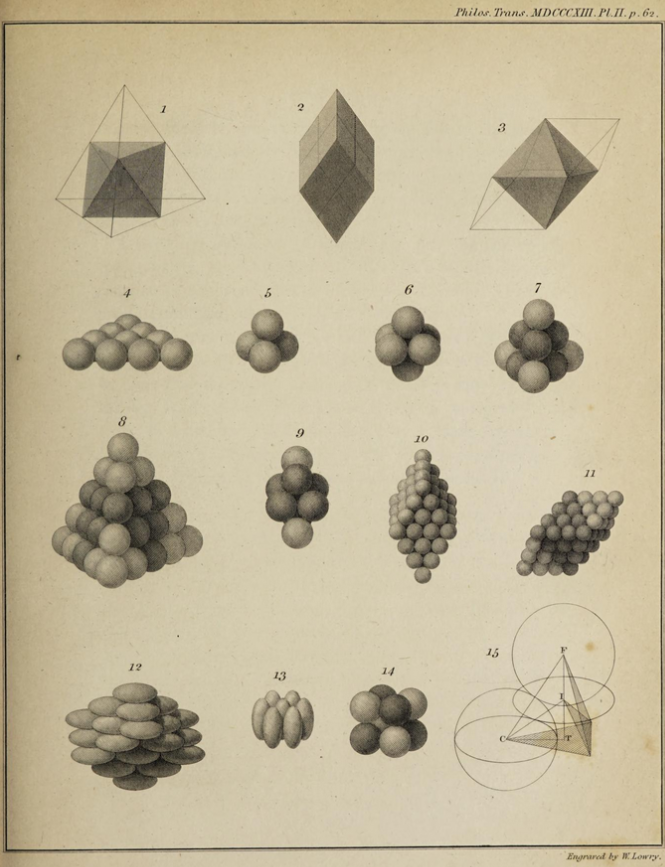
Possible molecular structures of crystals built from spheres and ellipsoids (Wollaston, 1813).

From the late 18th century it became apparent that a crystal of a substance was composed of units, whether thought of as atoms, ions, molecules, or polyhedra, in a regular spatial arrangement, termed its crystal structure.

The most notable early theory for crystal structures was that of René Just Haüy. In 1801 Haüy, published his Traité de Minéralogie in four volumes, the last of which was an atlas of plates which was considered "among the most wonderful of the 19th century". It has been described as "a work of comprehensive insight, and much of it, written with literary fluency". In this work Haüy described how the law of rational indices establishes relationships between the orientations of the crystal faces, and explains that crystalline solids are formed by replicas of what would now be considered a unit cell. Haüy's theory called for fixed mineral species (based on their molécule intégrante), fixed crystal morphology, and constant chemical composition. This was a mineralogical equivalent to the law of definite proportions in chemistry.

John G. Burke (1966) and Hans-Werner Schütt (1984) proposed Haüy's crystal structure theory as an example of a paradigm in the sense of The Structure of Scientific Revolutions by Thomas S. Kuhn (1962). In 1822 Haüy published Traité de Cristallographie an updated version of his work of 1801. Haüy postulated, "to each specific substance with a well defined chemical composition, capable of existence in a crystalline form, there corresponds a shape that is specific and characteristic of that substance."

In 1808 John Dalton published his atomic theory of matter. In Dalton's theory, there were four key assertions: "matter is made up of roughly spherical atoms, which were indivisible and indestructible; all atoms of a given element are identical in mass and properties; compounds are formed by a combination of two or more different kinds of atoms; and chemical reactions involve the rearrangement of atoms". In his book A New System of Chemical Philosophy, crystals are considered as a periodic arrangement of spherical atoms. However, Dalton stated that it was premature to form any theory of crystallization. Kuhn proposed Dalton's atomic theory as an example of a paradigm in which Dalton asserted that atoms can only combine in simple, whole-number ratios (law of multiple proportions). Under this new paradigm, any reaction which did not occur in fixed proportion could not be a chemical process.

There was a contradiction between the crystallographic and chemical paradigms. Haüy's theory asserted that crystals were composed of polyhedral units stacked up in three dimensions without gaps; Dalton's theory, by contrast, implied that crystals were constructed by a periodic arrangement of spherical atoms in space. Haüy's theory was generally accepted by his fellow mineralogists in the period 1801–1815 but then came under attack from the German dynamist school led by Christian Samuel Weiss. Weiss and his followers studied the external symmetry of crystals rather than their internal structure. In 1819, Weiss demonstrated the generality of the phenomenon of hemihedry (half of the vertices/edges/faces of a crystal act differently from the other half), thus challenging Haüy's holohedral approach (all vertices/edges/faces of a crystal act in the same manner). Haüy's crystal structure theory was criticised as over-simplistic by William Hyde Wollaston in 1809 and by Henry James Brooke in 1819. Haüy also tended to ignore experimental results that contradicted his structural theory, such as those achieved with the more accurate reflection goniometer invented by Wollaston in 1809.

In 1813 Wollaston adopted Dalton's ideas and proposed using sphere packing to model crystal structures. In 1814 André-Marie Ampère published a theory of the chemical combination of substances, based on Haüy's polyhedral forms. However, Ampère's work had little impact on contemporary chemists.

In 1819 David Brewster classified crystals according to their optical properties, as isotropic, uniaxial, or biaxial. In a paper published in 1830 Brewster attempted to relate the phenomenon of double refraction to the arrangement of the molecules in crystals. If a crystal has three axes at right angles to each other then, if they are equivalent, the crystal is isotropic, if two are equivalent and the third different, the crystal is uniaxial, and if all three are different, the crystal is biaxial. In 1822 John Herschel proposed a causal relationship between the handedness of quartz crystals (right- or left-handed) and the direction of their optical rotation.

In 1840 Friedrich Ludwig Hünefeld described the first crystallization of a protein; Hünefeld obtained lamellar crystals (later identified as haemoglobin) by putting the blood of an earthworm between two slides.

== Isomorphism ==
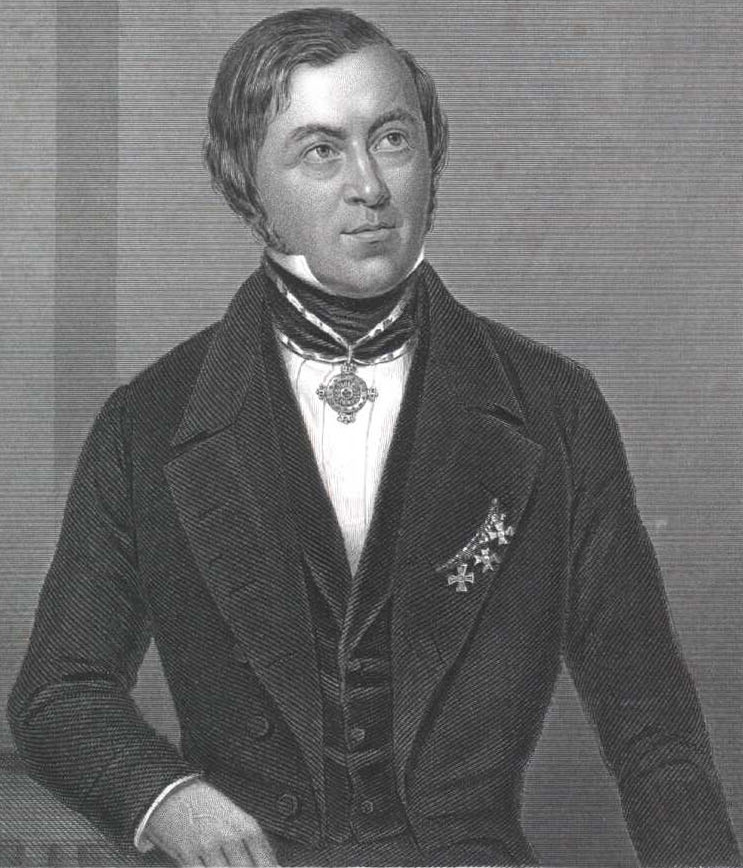
Eilhard Mitscherlich

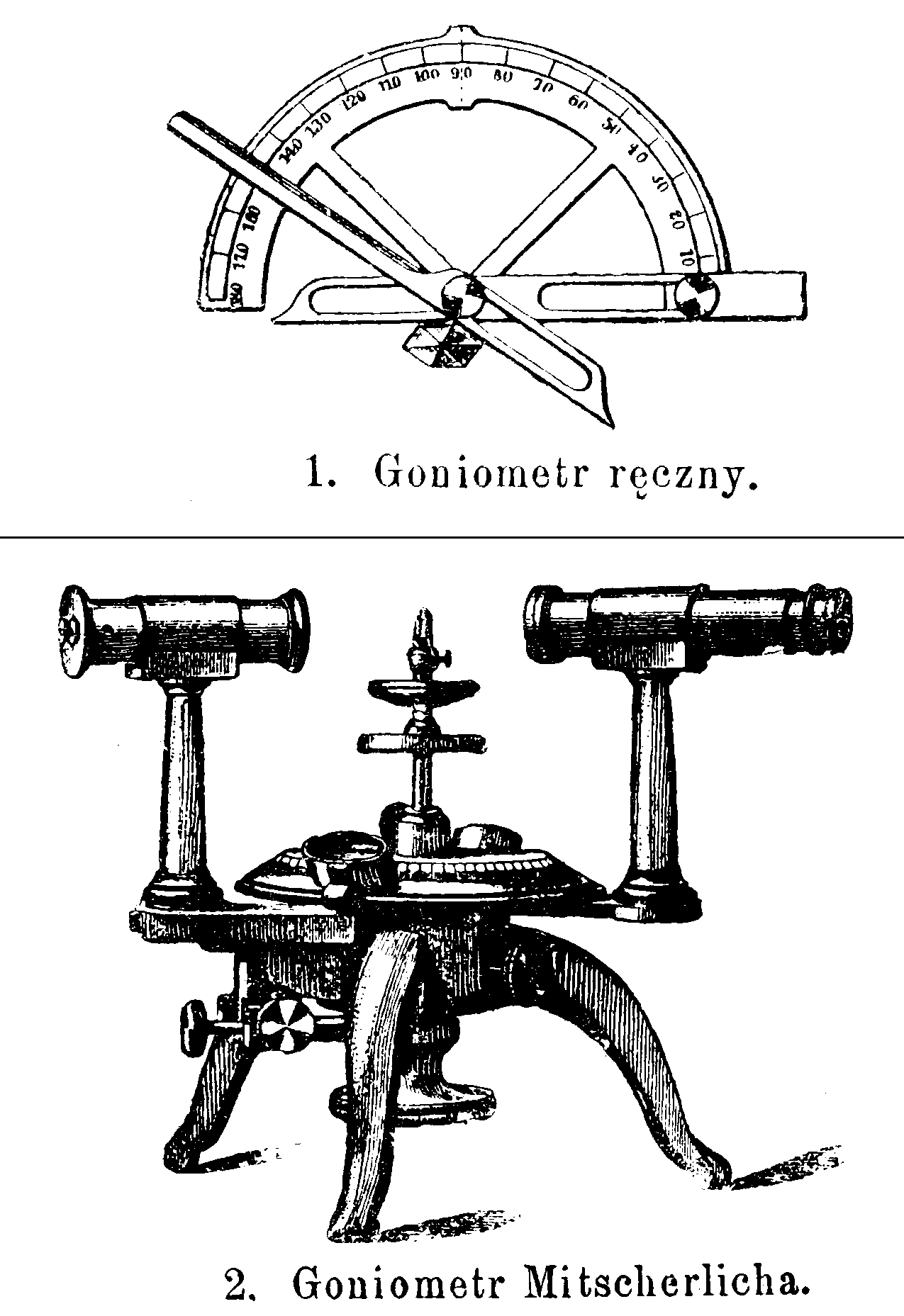
Goniometers

Mitscherlich discovered isomorphism (1819) and improved the reflecting goniometer (1843)

Originally, René Just Haüy considered that each chemical compound had a characteristic crystalline form. However, based on his 1808 work with aragonite and his earlier studies of calcite, which are two different forms of calcium carbonate (CaCO_{3}), Haüy had to concede that substances with the same chemical composition but different molecular arrangements could have different crystalline forms.

In 1819 Eilhard Mitscherlich discovered the law of isomorphism which states that compounds which contain the same number of atoms, and have similar structures, tend to exhibit similar crystal forms. Mitscherlich carried out the first systematic research on the dependence of crystal forms on their chemical nature. The discovery of isomorphism was the first major step in chemical crystallography and Emil Wohlwill regarded Mitscherlich's work on isomorphism as a milestone in the history of the atomic-molecular theory. The discovery of the phenomena of isomorphism and polymorphism dealt a clear blow to Haüy's crystal structure theory.

Mitscherlich's findings were a central consideration of the atomic weight determinations in 1819 by Jöns Jacob Berzelius, a leading proponent of Dalton's atomic theory. Berzelius classified minerals by their chemical composition rather than by their crystal morphology, as was the established practice. Mitscherlich's research, together with the work of Alexis Thérèse Petit and Pierre-Louis Dulong that heat capacities of solids vary with temperature and inversely with atomic weight, led Berzelius to declare them as a positive confirmation of the atomic theory.

A contemporary historical review of the development of isomorphism in the 19th century was written by Andreas Artsruni.

== Polymorphism ==
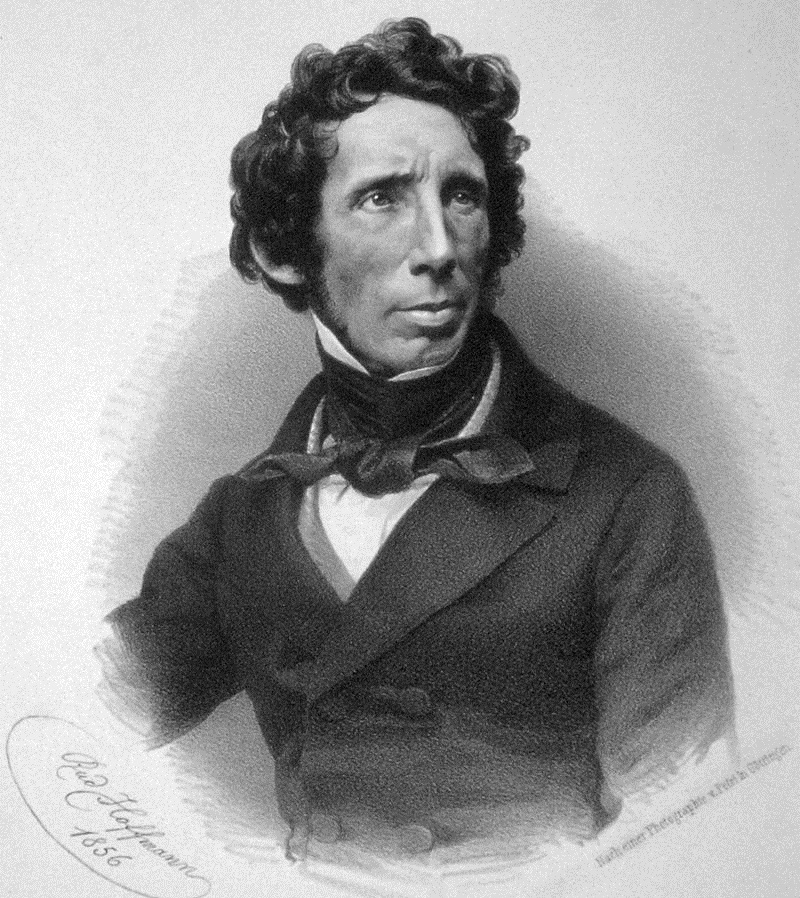
Friedrich Wöhler

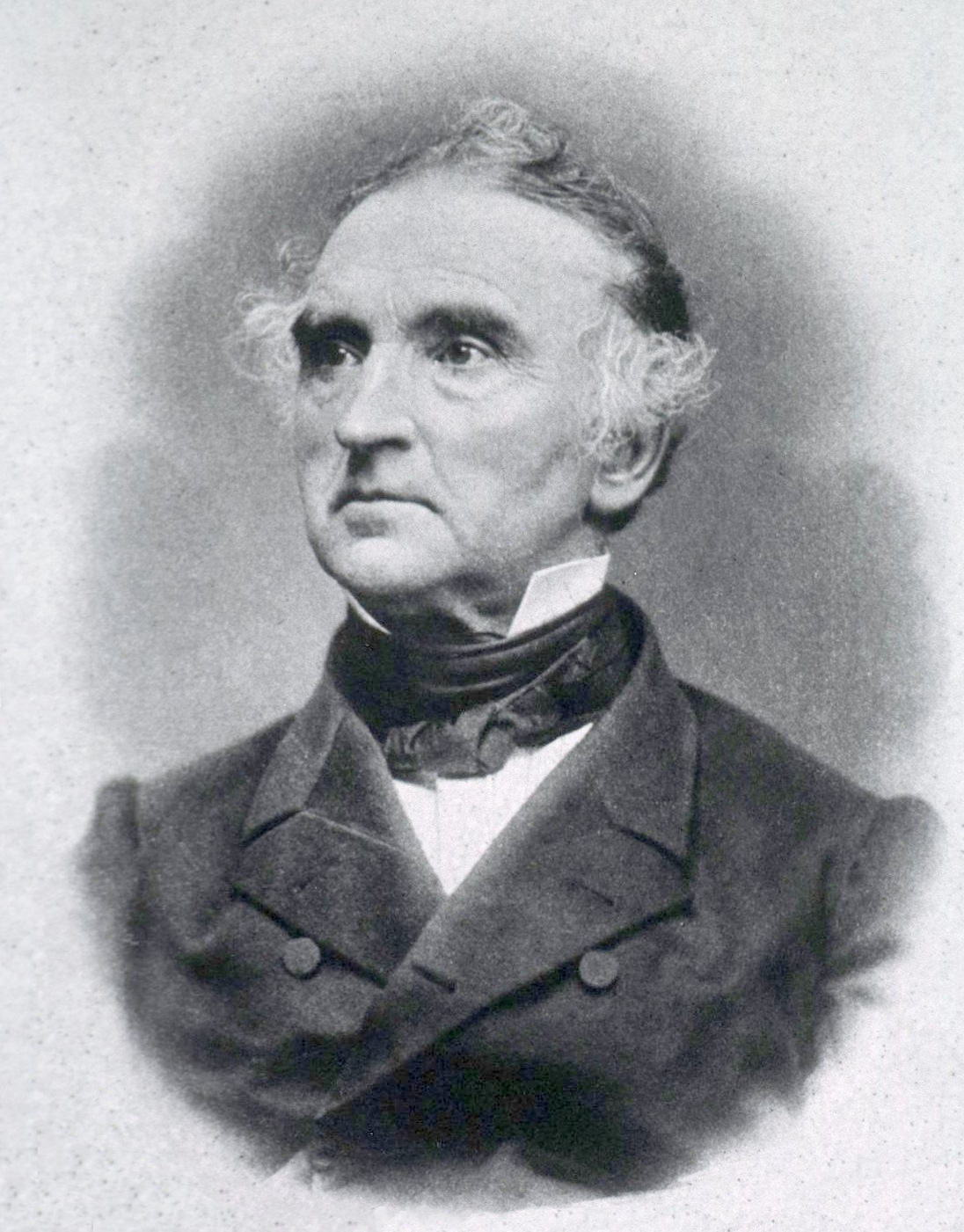
Justus von Liebig

Discoverers of the first polymorphic organic substance (1832)

In crystallography, polymorphism is the phenomenon where a compound can crystallize into more than one crystal structure; in the case of elements the term allotropy is sometimes used. An example of polymorphism is titanium dioxide (TiO_{2}), which occurs in four known natural polymorphic forms (minerals with the same composition but different structure): brookite (orthorhombic), akaogiite (monoclinic), anatase (tetragonal) and rutile (tetragonal).

Eilhard Mitscherlich discovered polymorphism ("dimorphism") in his studies of sodium phosphate (1821) and sulphur (1823). In the 1830s the development of the microscope enhanced observations of polymorphism and aided Moritz Ludwig Frankenheim's studies. Frankenheim was able to demonstrate methods to induce crystal phase changes, for example the use of solvents or physical scratching, and formally summarized his findings on the nature of polymorphism. Soon after, the more sophisticated polarized light microscope came into use, and it provided better visualization of crystalline phases allowing crystallographers to distinguish between different polymorphs. The hot stage was invented and fitted to a polarized light microscope by Otto Lehmann in about 1877. This invention helped crystallographers determine melting points and observe polymorphic transitions.

The first polymorphic organic substance, benzamide, was discovered by Friedrich Wöhler and Justus von Liebig in 1832.

In 1870 Paul Groth defined wikt:morphotropy as the state of two crystals whose similar physical structure is due to similar chemical composition. Groth examined the change in symmetry of a crystal as a result of the replacement of a hydrogen atom by another univalent atom or radical. Morphotropy is also referred to as isogonism in which each vertex is surrounded by the same kinds of face in the same or reverse order, and with the same angles between corresponding faces.

In 1897 Wilhelm Ostwald introduced Ostwald's rule, to describe the formation of polymorphs. The rule states that usually the less stable polymorph crystallizes first. Ostwald's rule is not a universal law but a common tendency observed in nature.

== Molecular chirality ==
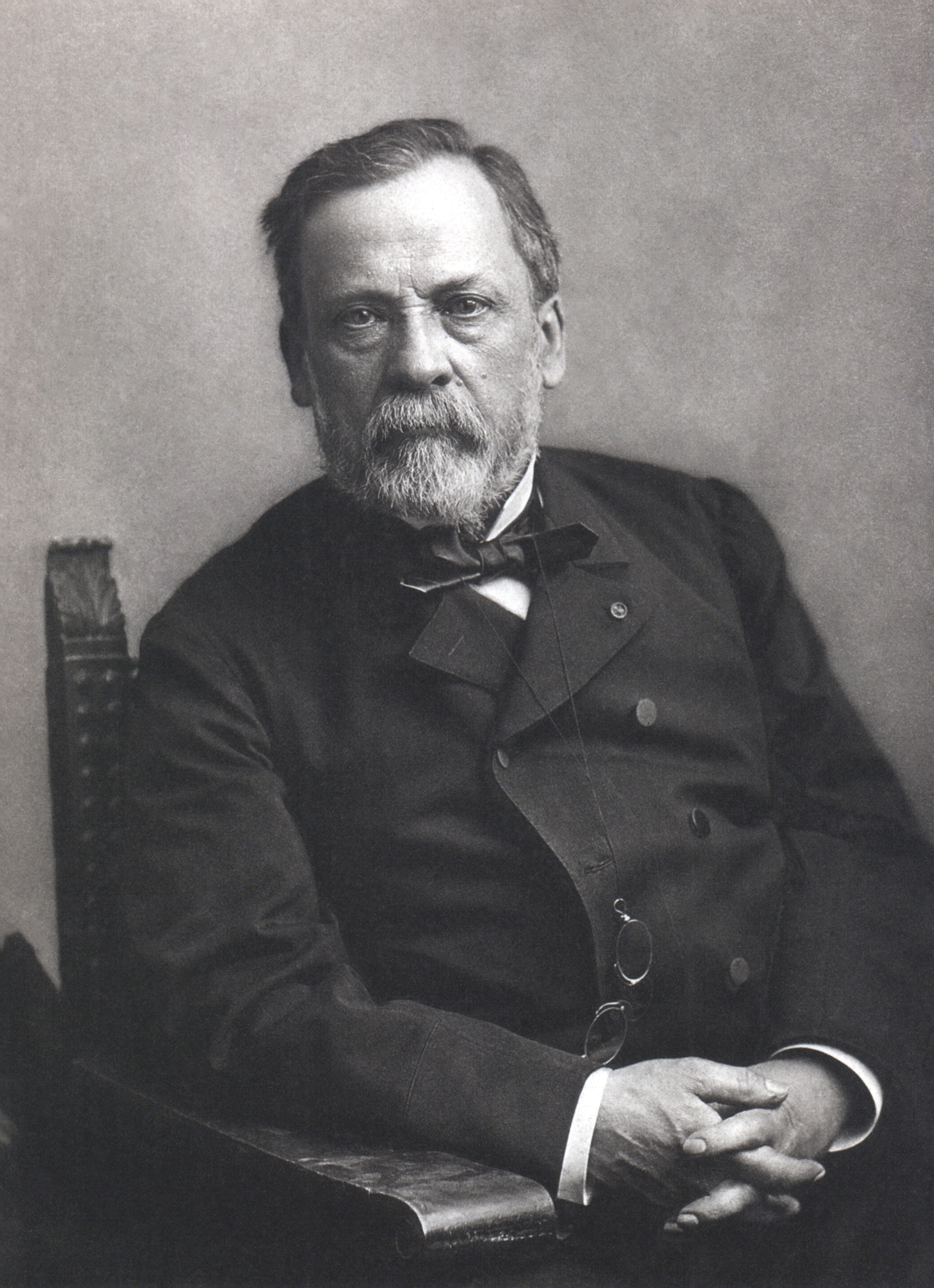
Louis Pasteur

Dextro and levorotary forms of tartrate crystals

Discoverer of molecular chirality (1848)

In 1811 François Arago constructed a polariscope and used it to discover that quartz crystals would rotate the plane of polarization of polarized light. Shortly after Jean-Baptiste Biot found a similar optical rotation effect for solutions, for example tartaric acid, and concluded that the effect was a inherent property of certain molecules.

In 1830 Jöns Jacob Berzelius discovered that tartaric and racemic acids have the same elementary composition, and concluded that a difference in the arrangement of the atoms in the molecules creates compounds with different chemical properties; in the same paper Berzelius suggested the term "isomerism" for the phenomenon.

In 1831 Mitscherlich was asked by Berzelius to study the tartrates in order to determine the differences between two isomers, tartaric acid and racemic acid. By 1832, Jean-Baptiste Biot had discovered that tartaric acid from grape juice was dextrorotatory and that racemic acid was optically inactive. In 1844 Mitscherlich found that the solution of sodium ammonium tartrate was optically active, but that of sodium ammonium paratartrate was optically inactive. The work of Biot and Mitscherlich was the starting point for research by the French chemist Louis Pasteur, a doctoral student of Gabriel Delafosse and a colleague of Auguste Laurent.

In 1848 Louis Pasteur gave the general relation between crystal morphology and rotatory polarization. Pasteur solved the mystery of polarized light acting differently with chemically identical crystals and solutions by discovering the phenomenon of molecular asymmetry, that is that molecules could be chiral and exist as a pair of enantiomers. Pasteur's method was to physically separate the crystals of a racemic mixture of sodium ammonium tartrate into right- and left-handed crystals, and then dissolve them to make two separate solutions which rotated polarized light in opposite directions. Pasteur's research was in part informed by considerations of molecular symmetry. Pasteur also proposed two other methods for the isolation of optically active enantiomers from racemic mixtures: by the use of optically active bases, e.g. strychnine, or by means of living organisms, e.g. bacteria or yeasts.

William Thomson (Lord Kelvin) introduced the word "chiral" in 1904 to describe handed figures. Objects that do not exhibit optical isomerism are said to be "achiral", that is their image in a plane mirror can be made congruent with itself. The term chirality has almost completely displaced the term "dissymmetry" which was used by Pasteur.

== Liquid crystals ==
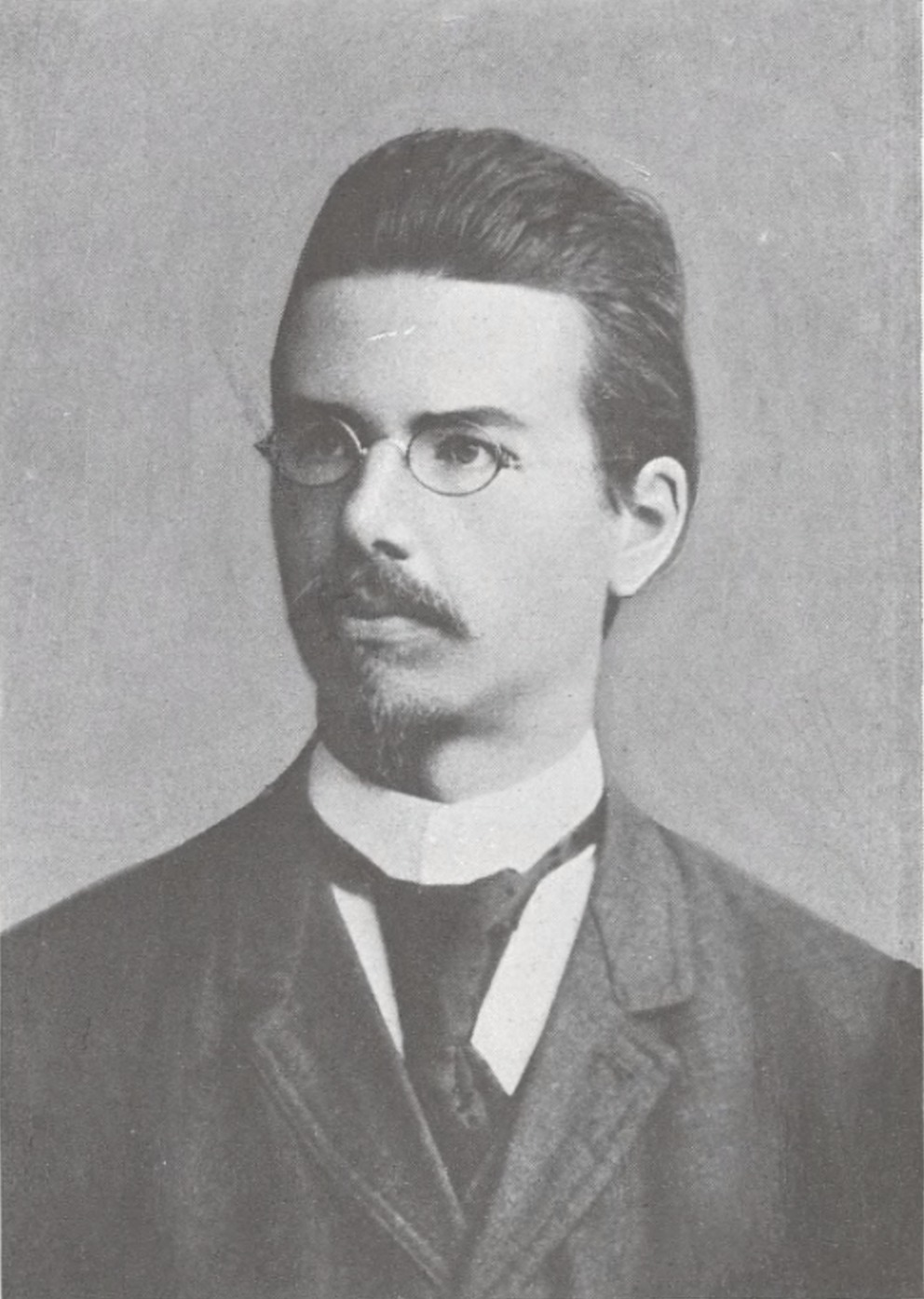
Friedrich Reinitzer

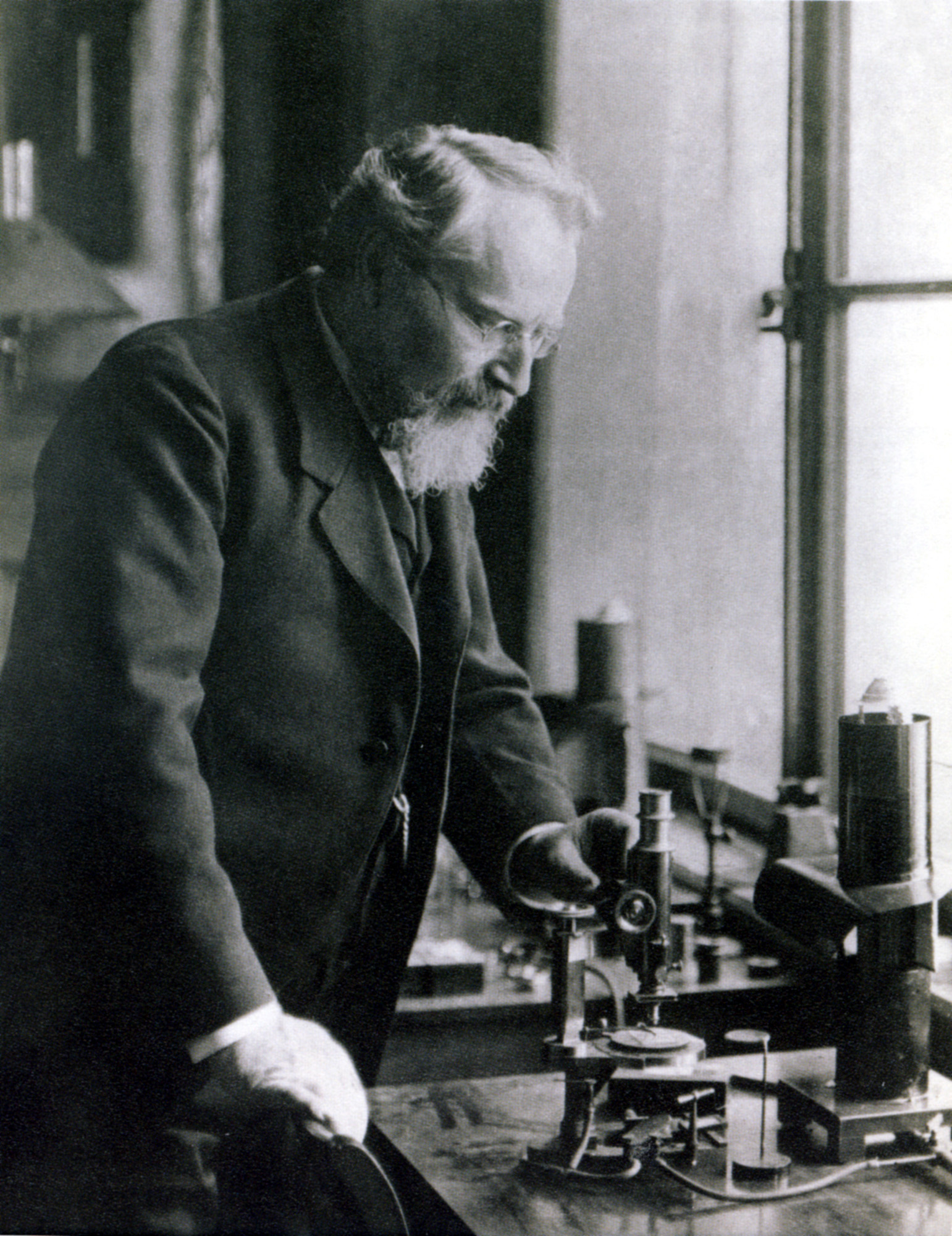
Otto Lehmann

Discoverers of liquid crystals (1888-9)

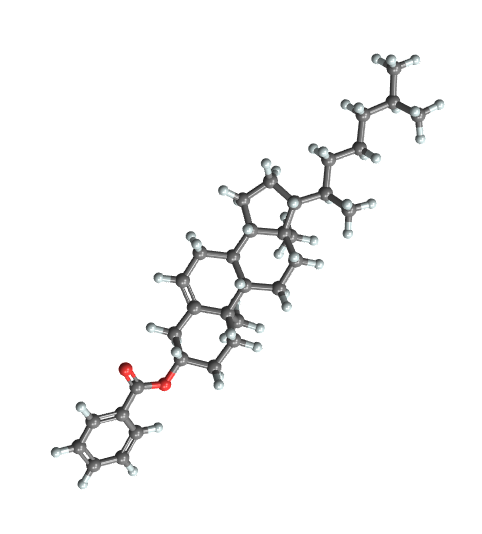
Cholesteryl benzoate

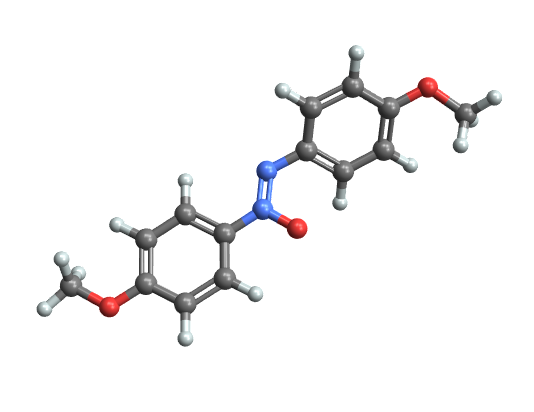
para-azoxyanisole

Liquid crystal molecules

In 1888 Friedrich Reinitzer examined the properties of various derivatives of cholesterol which now belong to the class of materials known as cholesteric liquid crystals. Previously, other researchers had observed distinct colour effects when cooling cholesterol derivatives just above the freezing point, but had not associated it with a new phenomenon. Reinitzer found that cholesteryl benzoate does not melt in the same way as most substances, but has two melting points. At 145.5 °C (293.9 °F) it melts into a cloudy liquid, and at 178.5 °C (353.3 °F) it melts again and the cloudy liquid becomes clear. The phenomenon is reversible. Reinitzer sought assistance to understand the phenomenon and, on 14 March 1888, he wrote to Otto Lehmann. They exchanged letters and samples. Lehmann examined the intermediate cloudy fluid, and reported seeing crystallites. Reinitzer's colleague Victor Leopold von Zepharovich also indicated that the intermediate "fluid" was crystalline. Reinitzer published his results, with credit to Lehmann and von Zepharovich, on 3 May 1888.

By that time, Reinitzer had discovered and described three important features of liquid crystals (the term was coined by Lehmann in a 1904 monograph): the existence of two melting points, the reflection of circularly polarized light, and the ability to rotate the direction of polarized light.

Reinitzer did not pursue the study of liquid crystals further, although in 1908 he had to defend his role in their discovery when Lehmann claimed the priority. The research was continued by Lehmann who started a systematic study, first of cholesteryl benzoate, and then of related compounds which exhibited the double-melting phenomenon. He was able to make observations in polarized light, and his microscope was equipped with a hot stage (sample holder equipped with a heater) enabling high temperature observations. The intermediate cloudy phase clearly sustained flow, but other features, particularly the signature under a microscope, convinced Lehmann that he was dealing with a solid. By the end of August 1889 he had published his results. Lehmann's paper prompted work by Ludwig Gattermann who in 1890 published a paper on the synthesis of azoxyphenol ethers, such as para-azoxyanisole, which exhibited the same double-melting behaviour.

Lehmann's interpretation of his results was controversial, and was not accepted by Gustav Heinrich Tammann, Georg Hermann Quincke, and Walther Nernst. In 1905 research by Rudolf Schenck addressed and largely resolved the objections of Tamman, Quincke and Nernst. Lehmann's work was continued and significantly expanded by the German chemist Daniel Vorländer who from the beginning of the 20th century had synthesized most of the liquid crystals known. In 1910–1922 research on liquid crystals, led by Georges Friedel, was carried on in France. In the period before X-rays liquid crystals were seen as merely a curiosity by scientists, and the field did not yield applications until the second half of the 20th century.

Liquid crystals are now known to have one- or two-dimensional periodicity, with rod or layer symmetry respectively.

== Late 19th century ==
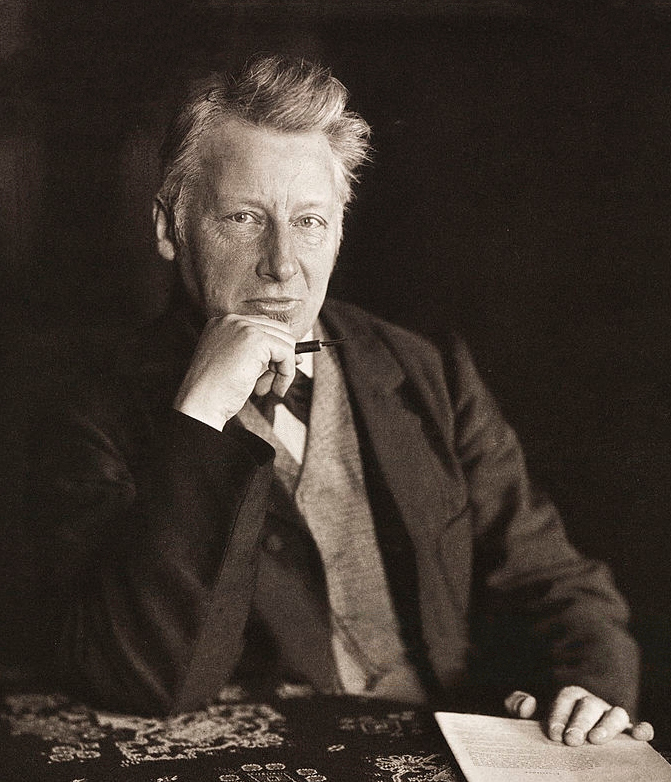
Jacobus van 't Hoff

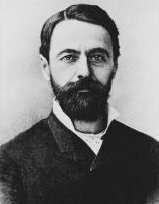
Joseph Le Bel

Discoverers of the tetrahedral carbon atom (1874)

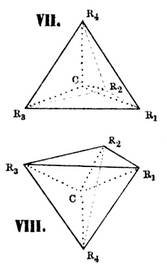
Enantiomers of tetrahedral carbon atom (van 't Hoff, 1874)

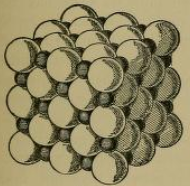
Sphere packing by William Barlow, 1897 representing the structure of rock-salt (NaCl)

From the 1830s Haüy's molecular crystal structure theory started to be combined with the atomic theory of the chemists to produce a view of a crystal as the regular arrangement of atoms or molecules in space. In 1849 Auguste Bravais related the symmetry of the crystal, considered as one of 14 space lattices, to that of its constituting molecules and formalized the reticular interpretation of hemihedry given by Gabriel Delafosse. In 1852 Delafosse attempted to relate the structure of the molecule to the external shape of the crystal.

During the 1850s and 1860s a "quiet revolution" took place in structural chemistry according to Alan J. Rocke, a historian of chemistry. The main features of the revolution were the clarification of the concept of atomic weight (Stanislao Cannizzaro), the definition of the idea of valence (then known as atomicity), and new chemical structural ideas, such as the benzene structure of a ring of alternating double and single carbon bonds (August Kekulé). These developments in chemistry were largely independent of the mathematical and geometrical direction of crystallography in the period 1850–1895 which had little concern with the practicalities of atomic and molecular arrangement.

In 1869 Emanuele Paternò predicted that the four valences of carbon have identical chemical properties and illustrated three predicted isomers of dibromethane showing the tetrahedral carbon atom for the first time. While Paternò's work was the first publication of tetrahedral-valent carbon it is not clear that he recognized the full consequences of the hypothesis.

In 1874 Jacobus Henricus van 't Hoff and Joseph Le Bel independently proposed the tetrahedral arrangement of the atoms bound to carbon in organic molecules. Van't Hoff's theory validated and explained Pasteur's results with tartrate crystals, and Johannes Wislicenus' work with isomeric lactic acids, and was fundamental to the further development of stereochemistry.

Until the use of X-rays there was no way to determine the actual crystal structure of even the simplest substances such as salt (NaCl). For example in the 1880s, William Barlow proposed several crystal structures based on close-packing of spheres some of which were validated later by X-ray crystallography; however, the available data were too scarce in the 1880s to accept his models as conclusive. In the period between the discovery of X-rays (1895) and X-ray diffraction (1912) Barlow and William Jackson Pope developed the principles of packing, and showed how to deduce the structures of some simple compounds. In the 1930s Linus Pauling was impressed that Barlow had assigned many crystal structures of metals (copper, silver, and gold to cubic close packing, and magnesium, zinc, and cadmium to hexagonal close packing) and salts (sodium, potassium and caesium chlorides) which were subsequently proved to be correct by X-ray crystallography. William Johnson Sollas emphasised the importance of different atomic sizes in constructing simple crystals, and correctly concluded that the sodium and chlorine atoms in salt would be of different sizes.

In 1887 Johannes Wislicenus published a study of stereoisomerism in unsaturated compounds.

Groth made a systematic classification of minerals based on their chemical composition and crystal structure and published his results in his 5-volume Chemische Kristallographie in 1906–1919, which contained crystalline morphology and physical property data on nearly 10,000 substances.

In 1913 Walter Wahl summarised the known connections between chemical composition and crystalline form as isomorphism (Mitscherlich), morphotropism (Groth), and enantiomorphism (Pasteur and van 't Hoff).

In his preface to Andreas Fock's An introduction to chemical crystallography Pope summarised the state of chemical crystallography in 1895 as follows:

"Our knowledge of the physical and geometrical properties of crystals is now very complete, but their relations to chemical constitution and composition are as yet but little known."

After 1912 crystallography would develop dramatically with the widespread adoption of X-ray diffraction to determine crystal structures.

== Research community ==
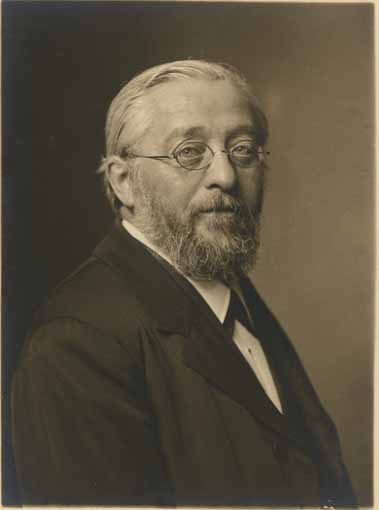
Paul Groth

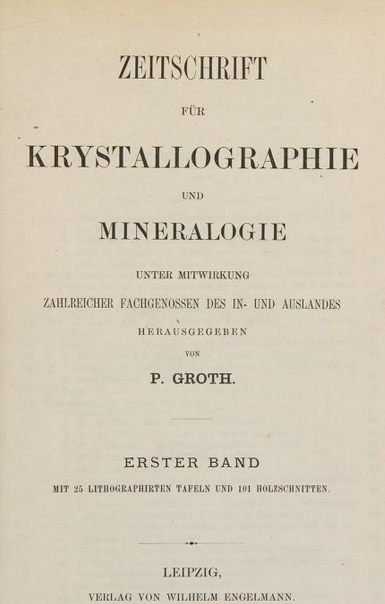
Z. Kryst., 1, 1877

Founder of Zeitschrift für Krystallographie

Before the 20th century crystallography was not a well-established academic discipline. There were no academic positions specifically in crystallography. Workers in the field normally carried out their crystallographic research as an ancillary to other employment(s), or had independent means. The leading workers in the field of chemical crystallography were employed as follows:

- Professors
  - Mathematics or science: Arago, Berzelius, Biot, Curie, Frankenheim, Lehmann, Liebig, Mitscherlich, Ostwald, Pasteur, Reinitzer, Wöhler
  - Mineralogy: Delafosse, Groth, Haüy, Neumann,
- Other employment: Brewster (editor), Romé de l'Isle (cataloguer), Sohncke (meteorological service), Wollaston (physician)
- Independently wealthy: Barlow, Herschel, Huygens

In the nineteenth century there were informal schools of crystallography researchers in France (Arago, Biot, Curie, Delafosse, Haüy, Pasteur), Germany (Frankenheim, Groth, Lehmann, Liebig, Mitscherlich, Neumann, Reinitzer, Sohncke, Wöhler) and England (Barlow, Brewster, Herschel, Wollaston).

Until the founding of Zeitschrift für Krystallographie und Mineralogie by Paul Groth in 1877 there was no lead journal for the publication of crystallographic papers. The majority of crystallographic research was published in the journals of national scientific societies, or in mineralogical journals. The inauguration of Groth's journal marked the emergence of crystallography as a mature science independent of geology.

== See also ==
- History of atomic theory
- History of molecular theory
- History of crystallography before X-rays
  - Geometrical crystallography before X-rays
  - Physical crystallography before X-rays
- Timeline of chemistry
- Timeline of crystallography

== Works cited ==
- Alworth, William L. (1972). "Historical development of the concept of biological stereospecificity". Stereochemistry and its application in biochemistry: the relation between substrate symmetry and biological stereospecificity. New York: Wiley-Interscience. pp. 1–14. ISBN 0-471-02518-6.
- Ampère, André-Marie (1814). "Lettre de M. Ampère à M. le Comte Berthollet, sur la détermination des proportions dans lesquelles les corps se combinent, d'après le nombre et la disposition respective des molécules dont leurs parties intégrantes sont composées" [Letter from Mr. Ampère to Mr. le Comte Berthollet, on the determination of the proportions in which the bodies combine, according to the number and the respective arrangement of the molecules whose integral parts are composed]. Annales de chimie (in French). 94: 43–86.
- Arago, François (1811). "Mémoire sur une modification remarquable qu'éprouvent les rayons lumineux dans leur passage à travers certains corps diaphanes et sur quelques autres nouveaux phénomènes d'optique" [Memoir on a remarkable modification that light rays experience during their passage through certain translucent substances and on some other new optical phenomena]. Mémoires de la classe des sciences mathématiques et physiques de l'Institut Impérial de France, première partie (in French): 93–134.
- Aroyo, Mois I.; Müller, Ulrich; Wondratschek, Hans (2011). "Historical introduction". In Wondratschek, H.; Müller, U. (eds.). International tables for crystallography. Vol. A1: Symmetry relations between space groups (second ed.). Dordrecht; Boston, U.S.A: D. Reidel Pub. Co.; Sold and distributed in the U.S.A. and Canada by Kluwer Academic Publishers Group. p. 2. doi:10.1107/97809553602060000101. ISBN 978-1-4020-2355-2.
- Authier, A. (2013). Early days of x-ray crystallography. International Union of Crystallography Texts on Crystallography. Oxford: Oxford University Press. doi:10.1093/acprof:oso/9780199659845.001.0001. ISBN 978-0-19-875405-3.
- Authier, A., ed. (2014). International Tables for Crystallography: Physical properties of crystals. Vol. D. p. 11. doi:10.1107/97809553602060000113. ISBN 978-1-118-76229-5.
- Arzruní, Andreás (1893). Physikalische Chemie der Krystalle [Physical chemistry of crystals] (in German). Braunschweig.
- Barlow, William M. (1883a). "Probable nature of the internal symmetry of crystals". Nature. 29 (738): 186–188. Bibcode:1883Natur..29..186B. doi:10.1038/029186a0.
- Barlow, William M. (1883b). "Probable nature of the internal symmetry of crystals". Nature. 29 (738): 205–207. Bibcode:1883Natur..29..205B. doi:10.1038/029205a0.
- Barlow, William M. (1884). "Probable nature of the internal symmetry of crystals". Nature. 29 (748): 404. Bibcode:1884Natur..29..404B. doi:10.1038/029404b0. S2CID 4016086.
- Barlow, William (1897). "A Mechanical Cause of Homogeneity of structures and symmetry geometrically investigated: with special application to crystals and to chemical combination". Scientific Proceedings of the Royal Dublin Society. 8: 527–689.
- Barlow, William; Pope, William Jackson (1906). "A development of the atomic theory which correlates chemical and crystalline structure and leads to a demonstration of the nature of valency". J. Chem. Soc., Trans. 89: 1675–1744. doi:10.1039/ct9068901675.
- Barlow, William; Pope, William Jackson (1907). "The relation between the crystalline form and the chemical constitution of simple inorganic substances". J. Chem. Soc., Trans. 91: 1150–1214. doi:10.1039/ct9079101150.
- Barlow, William; Pope, William Jackson (1910). "The relation between the crystal structure and the chemical composition, constitution, and configuration of organic substances". J. Chem. Soc., Trans. 97: 2308–2388. doi:10.1039/ct9109702308.
- Bergman, Torbern O. (1773). "Variae crystallorum formae a spatho orthae" [Various forms of crystals from orthogonal spar]. Nova Acta Regiae Societatis Scientiarum Upsaliensis (in Latin). 1: 150–155.
- Bergman, T. O. (1780). "De formis crystallorum, praesertim e spatho ortis". Opuscula Physica et Chemica (in Latin). Vol. 2. Uppsala: Johan Edman. pp. 1–25. Archived from the original on 29 December 2009.
- Bernal, J. D. (1953). "Molecular asymmetry". Science and Industry in the Nineteenth Century. London: Routledge & Kegan Paul. pp. 181–219.
- Bernstein, Joel (2002). "Introduction and historical background". Polymorphism in molecular crystals. Oxford; New York: Clarendon Press Oxford University Press. pp. 1–28. doi:10.1093/acprof:oso/9780199236565.003.0001. ISBN 0-19-850605-8.
- Berzelius, J. J. (January 1830). "Ueber die Zusammensetzung der Weinsäure und Traubensäure (John's Säure aus den Vogesen), über das Atomengewicht des Bleioxyds, nebst allgemeinen Bemerkungen über solche Körper, die gleiche Zusammensetzung, aber ungleiche Eigenschaften besitzen" [On the composition of tartaric acid and grape acid (John's acid from the Vosges), on the atomic weight of lead oxide, with general remarks about such bodies having the same composition but unequal properties]. Annalen der Physik (in German). 95 [19] (7): 305–335. Bibcode:1830AnP....95..305B. doi:10.1002/andp.18300950702.
- Biot, Jean-Baptiste (1812a). "Mémoire sur un nouveau genre d'oscillation que les molécules de la lumière éprouvent en traversant certains cristaux" [Memoir on a new kind of oscillation that light molecules experience when passing through certain crystals]. Mémoires de la Classe des Sciences Mathématiques et Physiques de l'Instut Impérial de France (in French). 13 (1): 1–371.
- Biot, Jean-Baptiste (1812b). "Sur la découverte d'une propriété nouvelle dont jouissent les forces polarisent des certains cristaux" [On the discovery of a new property demonstrated by the polarizing forces of certain crystals]. Mémoires de la Classe des Sciences Mathématiques et Physiques de l'Instut Impérial de France (in French). 13 (2): 19–30.
- Black, Simon N.; Seton, Linda (19 June 2024). "Curating Morphological Data: From the Compendium of P. von Groth to the Cambridge Structural Database". Crystal Growth & Design. 24 (12): 5051–5060. Bibcode:2024CrGrD..24.5051B. doi:10.1021/acs.cgd.4c00269.
- Boas, Marie (1969) [1959]. "Structure of matter and chemical theory in the seventeenth and eighteenth centuries". In Clagett, Marshall (ed.). Critical problems in the history of science. Madison, WI: The University of Wisconsin Press. pp. 499–514.
- Boscovich, Roger Joseph (1922) [1763]. A Theory of Natural Philosophy. Translated by Child, J. M. Chicago; London: Open Court.
- Boulliard, Jean-Claude; Cabaret, Delphine; Giura, Paolo (2022). "René-Just Haüy and the birth of crystallography". IUCr Newsletter. 30 (4). IUCr.
- Bowden, Mary Ellen (1997). Chemical achievers: the human face of the chemical sciences. Philadelphia: Chemical Heritage Foundation. ISBN 0-941901-12-2.
- Boyle, Robert (1661). The Sceptical Chemyst. London: Printed by J. Cadwell for J. Crooke at The Ship in St. Paul's church-yard.
- Boyle, Robert (8 October 2007) [1661]. The Sceptical Chymist. Project Gutenberg.
- Brandmüller, J. (1986). "An extension of the Neumann–Minnigerode–Curie principle". Computers & Mathematics with Applications. 12 (1–2). Elsevier BV: 97–100. doi:10.1016/0898-1221(86)90143-4.
- Brescia, Frank; Mangiaracina, Pietro (January 1976). "Conformational analysis, 1869". Journal of Chemical Education. 53 (1): 32–33. doi:10.1021/ed053p32.
- Brewster, David (1819). "On the connection between the primitive forms of crystals and the number of their axes of double refraction". Memoirs of the Wernerian Natural History Society. 3: 50–74. Archived from the original on 3 September 2014.
- Brewster, David (1830). "On the production of regular double refraction in the molecules of bodies by simple pressure; with observations on the origin of the doubly refracting structure". Philosophical Transactions of the Royal Society of London. 120: 87–95. doi:10.1098/rstl.1830.0007.
- Brock, Henry M. (1913). "Haüy, René-Just". In Herbermann, Charles G.; Pace, Edward A.; Pallen, Condé B.; Shahan, Thomas J.; Wynne, John J. (eds.). The Catholic Encyclopedia, Knights Of Columbus Special Edition. Vol. 7. New York: The Encyclopedia Press, Inc. p. 152.
- Brock, William H. (1997). Justus von Liebig: the chemical gatekeeper (1st ed.). Cambridge, U.K.: Cambridge University Press. ISBN 978-0-521-56224-9.
- Brooke, H. J. (1819). "Observations on a Memoir by the Abbé Haüy on the Measurement of the Angles of Crystals". Annals of Philosophy. 14: 453–456. "His [Haüy's] theory contains a principle which has in some instances conduced to error and which may affect its worth as a theory more than any consideration of the comparative merit of the goniometer. This principle is an imaginary simplicity which he supposes to exist naturally in the ratios of certain lines either upon or traversing a crystal ... and he is disposed to regard generally the disagreement of an observed measurement with this character rather as an error of the observation than a correction of his theoretic determination."
- Buerger, M. J. (1960). Crystal-Structure Analysis. New York: Wiley. pp. 1–6.
- Buerger, M. J.; Bloom, M. C. (1 November 1937). "Crystal Polymorphism". Zeitschrift für Kristallographie - Crystalline Materials. 96 (1–6): 182–200. doi:10.1524/zkri.1937.96.1.182.
- Burchard, Ulrich (1998). "History of the development of the crystallographic goniometer". The Mineralogical Record. 29 (6): 517–577, 580–583.
- Burke, John G. (1966). Origins of the science of crystals. Berkeley, CA: University of California Press.
- Burke, John G. (1970). "Sohncke, Leonhard". In Gillispie, Charles Coulston (ed.). Dictionary of scientific biography. Vol. 12. New York: Charles Scribner's Sons. pp. 511–512. ISBN 0-684-12924-8. Archived from the original on 16 November 2010.
- Burke, John G. (1973). "Lehmann, Otto". In Gillispie, Charles Coulston (ed.). Dictionary of scientific biography. Vol. 8. New York: Charles Scribner's Sons. pp. 148–149. ISBN 0-684-10119-X. Archived from the original on 16 November 2010.
- Cahn, Robert W. (12 August 1999). "Slaying the crystal homunculus". Nature. 400 (6745): 625. Bibcode:1999Natur.400..625C. doi:10.1038/23161.
- Cappeller, Moritz Anton (1723). Prodromus Crystallographiae De Crystallis Improprie Sic Dictis Commentarium [Preliminary treatise on crystallography: a commentary on improperly named crystals] (in Latin). Lucerne: Typis Henrici Rennwardi Wyssing. doi:10.3931/e-rara-86385.
- Cardano, Gerolamo (2013) [1550]. Forrester, John M. (ed.). The De subtilitate of Girolamo Cardano. Tempe AZ: Arizona Center for Medieval and Renaissance Studies. ISBN 978-0-86698-484-3.
- Clarke, Frank Wigglesworth (1908). "The Progress and Development of Chemistry in the Nineteenth Century". In Rogers, Howard J. (ed.). International Congress of Arts and Science. Vol. 7: Physics and Chemistry. London: University Alliance. pp. 221–240.
- Correns, Carl W. (1972). "Frankenheim, Moritz Ludwig". In Gillispie, Charles Coulston (ed.). Dictionary of scientific biography. Vol. 5. New York: Scribner. p. 124. ISBN 0-684-10116-5. Archived from the original on 19 October 2022.
- Crosland, M. P. (1970). "Biot, Jean-Baptiste". In Gillispie, Charles Coulston (ed.). Dictionary of scientific biography. Vol. 2. New York: Charles Scribner's Sons. pp. 133–140. ISBN 0-684-16963-0. Archived from the original on 16 November 2010.
- Cuevas-Diarte, Miguel Ángel; Reverter, Álvarez Santiago (2014). "Commented chronology of crystallography and structural chemistry". Dipòsit Digital. Universitat de Barcelona. hdl:2445/120608.
- Curie, Marie (1923). Pierre Curie. Translated by Kellogg, Charlotte and Vernon. New York: The Macmillan Company.
- Curie, Pierre (1894). "Sur la symétrie dans les phénomènes physiques, symétrie d'un champ électrique et d'un champ magnétique" [On symmetry in physical phenomena, symmetry of an electric field and a magnetic field]. Journal de Physique. 3e série (in French). 3: 393–415.
- Curie, Pierre (1982) [1894]. "On symmetry in physical phenomena, symmetry of an electric field and of a magnetic field". In Rosen, Joe (ed.). Symmetry in physics: selected reprints. Translated by Rosen, Joe; Copié, P. Stony Brook, NY: American Association of Physics Teachers. pp. 17–25.
- Dalton, John (1808). A new system of chemical philosophy. London: R. Bickerstaff. Archived from the original on 15 January 2008.
- Darvas, Gyorgy (2007). Symmetry: Cultural-historical and Ontological Aspects of Science-Arts Relations; the Natural and Man-made World in an Interdisciplinary Approach. Basel: Birkhäuser. ISBN 978-3-7643-7554-6.
- Deas, Herbert D. (June 1959). "Crystallography and crystallographers in England in the early nineteenth century: a preliminary survey". Centaurus. 6 (2): 129–148. Bibcode:1959Cent....6..129D. doi:10.1111/j.1600-0498.1959.tb00253.x.
- Debré, Patrice (1998). "Crystals: A New Law". Louis Pasteur. Translated by Forster, Elborg. Baltimore: The Johns Hopkins University Press. pp. 29–51. ISBN 978-0-8018-6529-9.
- Delafosse, G. (1843). "Recherches sur la cristallisation considérée sous les rapports physiques et mathématiques" [Research on crystallization considered from the physical and mathematical perspectives]. Mémoires présentés par divers savants à l'Académie des Sciences de l'Institut de France. Sciences mathématiques et physiques (in French). 8: 641–690.
- Dunmur, David; Sluckin, Tim (2011). Soap, science, and flat-screen TVs: a history of liquid crystals. New York: Oxford University Press. pp. 17–33. ISBN 978-0-19-954940-5.
- Evans, David S. (1972). "Herschel, John Frederick William". In Gillispie, Charles Coulston (ed.). Dictionary of scientific biography. Vol. 6. New York: Scribner. pp. 323–328. ISBN 0-684-10117-3. Archived from the original on 11 August 2021.
- Ferraris, Giovanni (31 March 2019). "Early contributions of crystallography to the atomic theory of matter". Substantia. 3 (1): 131–138 Pages. doi:10.13128/Substantia-81.
- Fischer, Walther (1972). "Groth, Paul Heinrich von". In Gillispie, Charles Coulston (ed.). Dictionary of scientific biography. Vol. 5. New York: Scribner. pp. 556–558. ISBN 0-684-10116-5. Archived from the original on 19 October 2022.
- Flack, H. D. (2009). "Louis Pasteur's discovery of molecular chirality and spontaneous resolution in 1848, together with a complete review of his crystallographic and chemical work" (PDF). Acta Crystallographica Section A. 65 (5): 371–389. Bibcode:2009AcCrA..65..371F. doi:10.1107/S0108767309024088. PMID 19687573. Archived from the original (PDF) on 8 September 2019.
- Fock, Andreas (1895). Pope, William J. (ed.). An introduction to chemical crystallography. Oxford: Clarendon Press.
- Frankenheim, M. L. (1839). "Ueber die Isomerie" [On isomerism]. Journal für Praktische Chemie (in German). 16 (1): 1–14. doi:10.1002/prac.18390160101.
- Gal, Joseph (January 2011). "Louis Pasteur, language, and molecular chirality. I. Background and Dissymmetry". Chirality. 23 (1): 1–16. doi:10.1002/chir.20866. PMID 20589938.
- Gal, Joseph (2013). "Molecular Chirality: Language, History, and Significance". In Schurig, Volker (ed.). Differentiation of Enantiomers I. Topics in Current Chemistry. Vol. 340. Cham: Springer. pp. 1–20. doi:10.1007/128_2013_435. ISBN 978-3-319-03238-2. PMID 23666078.
- Gattermann, L.; Ritschke, A. (1890). "Ueber Azoxyphenoläther" [On azoxyphenol ethers]. Berichte der Deutschen Chemischen Gesellschaft (in German). 23 (1): 1738–1750. doi:10.1002/cber.189002301285.
- Geison, Gerald L. (1974). "Pasteur, Louis". In Gillispie, Charles Coulston (ed.). Dictionary of scientific biography. Vol. 10. New York: Charles Scribner's Sons. pp. 486–494. ISBN 0-684-10121-1. Archived from the original on 2 June 2022.
- Geison, Gerald L.; Secord, James A. (1988). "Pasteur and the Process of Discovery: The Case of Optical Isomerism". Isis. 79 (1): 6–36. doi:10.1086/354632. JSTOR 234439. PMID 3286576.
- Giegé, Richard (December 2013). "A historical perspective on protein crystallization from 1840 to the present day". FEBS Journal. 280 (24): 6456–6497. doi:10.1111/febs.12580. PMID 24165393.
- Glaser, Robert (2015). "Historical development of structural chemistry: from alchemy to modern structural theory". Symmetry, spectroscopy, and crystallography: the structural nexus. Weinheim: Wiley-VCH. pp. 41–66. ISBN 978-3-527-33749-1.
- Glusker, Jenny P. (1990). "Brief history of chemical crystallography. II: Organic compounds". In Lima-de-Faria, J. (ed.). Historical atlas of crystallography. Dordrecht; Boston: Published for International Union of Crystallography by Kluwer Academic Publishers. pp. 91–93. ISBN 0-7923-0649-X.
- Goodman, D. C. (November 1969). "Problems in Crystallography in the Early Nineteenth Century". Ambix. 16 (3): 152–166. doi:10.1179/amb.1969.16.3.152.
- Goodman, D. C. (1969b). "Wollaston and the Atomic Theory of Dalton". In McCormmach, Russell (ed.). Historical Studies in the Physical Sciences. Vol. 1. Philadelphia: University of Pennsylvania Press. pp. 37–60. ISBN 0-8122-7600-0.
- Goodman, D. C. (1976). "Wollaston, William Hyde". In Gillispie, Charles Coulston (ed.). Dictionary of scientific biography. Vol. 14. New York: Charles Scribner's Sons. pp. 486–494. ISBN 0-684-12926-4. Archived from the original on 17 November 2010.
- Gratacap, Louis Pope (1918). "Haüy's Traité de minéralogie". American Mineralogist. 3: 100–125.
- Groth, P. (1870). "Ueber Beziehungen zwischen Krystallform und chemischer Constitution bei einigen organischen Verbindungen" [Relations between crystal form and chemical constitution in some organic compounds]. Annalen der Physik (in German). 217 [141] (9): 31–43. Bibcode:1870AnP...217...31G. doi:10.1002/andp.18702170904.
- Groth, P. (1906). An introduction to chemical crystallography. Translated by Marshall, Hugh. London: Gurney & Jackson.
- Groth, P. (1906–1919). Chemische Krystallographie [Chemical Crystallography] (in German). Vol. 1–5. Leipzig: W. Engelmann.
- Hahn, Roger (1970). "Arago, Dominique François Jean". In Gillispie, Charles Coulston (ed.). Dictionary of scientific biography. Vol. 1. New York: Charles Scribner's Sons. pp. 200–203. ISBN 0-684-16963-0. Archived from the original on 10 September 2012.
- Hales, Thomas C. (2006). "Historical Overview of the Kepler Conjecture". Discrete & Computational Geometry. 36 (1): 5–20. doi:10.1007/s00454-005-1210-2. ISSN 0179-5376.
- Hargittai, Balazs; Hargittai, Istvan (April 2024). "150 years of stereochemistry—selected examples". Structural Chemistry. 35 (2): 383–392. Bibcode:2024StrCh..35..383H. doi:10.1007/s11224-023-02276-z.
- Haüy, René-Just (1782a). "Sur la structure des cristaux de grenat" [On the structure of garnet crystals]. Observations sur la physique, sur l'histoire naturelle et sur les arts (in French). 19: 366–370.
- Haüy, René-Just (1782b). "Sur la structure des cristaux des spaths calcaires" [On the crystal structure of calcareous spars]. Observations sur la physique, sur l'histoire naturelle et sur les arts (in French). 20: 33–39.
- Haüy, René-Just (1784). Essai d'une théorie sur la structure des crystaux, appliquée à plusieurs genres de substances crystallisées [Attempt at a theory on the structure of crystals, applied to several kinds of crystallized substances] (in French). Paris: Gogué et Née de La Rochelle. Archived from the original on 26 September 2016.
- Haüy, René-Just (1801). Traité de Minéralogie [Mineralogical treatise] (in French). Vol. 1–5. Paris: Chez Louis.
- Haüy, René-Just (1 April 1808). "Sur l'arragonite" [On aragonite] (PDF). Journal des Mines (in French). 23 (136): 241–270.
- Haüy, René Just (1822). Traité de cristallographie [Crystallographic treatise] (in French). Paris: Bachelier.
- Herschel, John (1822). "On several remarkable Instances of deviation from Newton's Scale in the Tints developed by Crystals, with one Axis of Double Refraction, on exposure to Polarized Light". Transactions of the Cambridge Philosophical Society. 1: 21–53.
- Hiebert, Erwin N.; Körber, Hans-Günther (1981). "Ostwald, Friedrich Wilhelm". In Gillispie, Charles Coulston (ed.). Dictionary of scientific biography. Vol. 15: Supplement 1. New York: Charles Scribner's Sons. pp. 455–469. ISBN 0-684-16970-3. Archived from the original on 17 November 2010.
- Hoddeson, Lillian; Braun, Ernest; Teichmann, Jürgen; Weart, Spencer, eds. (1992). Out of the crystal maze: chapters from the history of solid state physics. New York: Oxford University Press. ISBN 0-19-505329-X.
- Holser, William T. (1981). "Barlow, William". In Gillispie, Charles Coulston (ed.). Dictionary of scientific biography. Vol. 1. New York: Charles Scribner's Sons. pp. 460–463. ISBN 0-684-16963-0. Archived from the original on 10 September 2012.
- Hooke, Robert (1665). Micrographia. London: The Royal Society.
- Hooykaas, R. (1972). "Haüy, René-Just". In Gillispie, Charles Coulston (ed.). Dictionary of scientific biography. Vol. 6. New York: Scribner. pp. 178–183. ISBN 0-684-10117-3. Archived from the original on 11 August 2021.
- Hooykaas, R. (1981). "Romé De L'Isle, Jean-Baptiste Louis". In Gillispie, Charles Coulston (ed.). Dictionary of scientific biography. Vol. 11. New York: Charles Scribner's & Sons. pp. 520–524. ISBN 0-684-16968-1. Archived from the original on 24 October 2011.
- Hünefeld, F. L. (1840). Der Chemismus in der thierischen Organisation [Chemical Properties in Animal Organization] (in German). Leipzig: F. A. Brockhaus.
- Huyghens, Christiaan (1690). Traité de la lumière [Treatise on light] (in French). Leiden: Pieter van der Aa.
- Jaeger, Francis Mauritius (1920). Lectures on the principle of symmetry and its applications in all natural sciences (2nd ed.). Amsterdam: Elsevier.
- Jorpes, J. Erik (1966). Jac. Berzelius: his life and work. Stockholm: Almqvist & Wiksell.
- Kahr, Bart; McBride, J. Michael (January 1992). "Optically Anomalous Crystals". Angewandte Chemie International Edition in English. 31 (1): 1–26. doi:10.1002/anie.199200013.
- Katzir, Shaul (September 2004). "The emergence of the principle of symmetry in physics". Historical Studies in the Physical and Biological Sciences. 35 (1): 35–65. doi:10.1525/hsps.2004.35.1.35.
- Kauffman, George B.; Myers, Robin D. (December 1998). "Pasteur's Resolution of Racemic Acid: A sesquicentennial Retrospect and a New Translation" (PDF). The Chemical Educator. 3 (6): 1–4. doi:10.1007/s00897980257a. Archived from the original (PDF) on 17 January 2006.
- Keen, Robin (2005). Buttner, Johannes (ed.). The life and works of Friedrich Wöhler (1800–1882) (PDF). Nordhausen: Traugott Bautz. ISBN 978-3-88309-224-9.
- Kelker, H. (January 1973). "History of Liquid Crystals". Molecular Crystals and Liquid Crystals. 21 (1–2): 1–48. Bibcode:1973MCLC...21....1K. doi:10.1080/15421407308083312.
- Kelker, H. (December 1988). "Survey of the Early History of Liquid Crystals". Molecular Crystals and Liquid Crystals Incorporating Nonlinear Optics. 165 (1): 1–43. Bibcode:1988MCLCI.165....1K. doi:10.1080/00268948808082195.
- Kelker, Hans; Knoll, Peter M. (July 1989). "Plenary Lecture. Some pictures of the history of liquid crystals". Liquid Crystals. 5 (1): 19–42. Bibcode:1989LoCr....5...19K. doi:10.1080/02678298908026350.
- Kepler, Johannes (1611). Strena seu de Nive Sexangula [A New Year's Gift of Hexagonal Snow] (in Latin). Frankfurt: G. Tampach.
- Kepler, Johannes (1966). Hardie, Colin (ed.). The Six-Cornered Snowflake. Oxford: Oxford University Press. ISBN 978-0-19-858120-8.
- Korbel, Petr (1993). "To the 100th Anniversary of the Death of Victor Leopold Ritter von Zepharovich" (PDF). In Höck, Volker; Koller, Friedrich (eds.). 125 Jahre Knappenwand; Proceedings of a Symposium held in Neukirchen am Großvenediger (Salzburg/Austria) September 1990. Wien: Geologische Bundesanst. pp. 159–161. ISBN 3-900312-85-0.
- Kostyanovsky, Remir G. (January 2003). "Louis Pasteur did it for us especially". Mendeleev Communications. 13 (3): 85–90. doi:10.1070/mc2003v013n03abeh001828.
- Kraus, Edward H. (1918). "Haüys contribution to our knowledge of isomorphism". The American Mineralogist. 3 (6): 126–130.
- Kubbinga, Henk (January 2012). "Crystallography from Haüy to Laue: controversies on the molecular and atomistic nature of solids". Zeitschrift für Kristallographie. 227 (1): 1–26. Bibcode:2012ZK....227....1K. doi:10.1524/zkri.2012.1459.
- Kuhn, Thomas S. (1962). The Structure of Scientific Revolutions (1st ed.). University of Chicago Press. LCCN 62019621.
- Kunz, George F. (1918). "The life and work of Haüy". The American Mineralogist. 3: 60–89.
- Ladd, Marcus Frederick Charles (2014). Symmetry of crystals and molecules. Oxford: Oxford University Press. pp. 13–15. ISBN 978-0-19-967088-8.
- Lagerwall, Sven T. (December 2013). "On some important chapters in the history of liquid crystals". Liquid Crystals. 40 (12): 1698–1729. Bibcode:2013LoCr...40.1698L. doi:10.1080/02678292.2013.831134.
- Lalena, John N. (April 2006). "From quartz to quasicrystals: probing nature's geometric patterns in crystalline substances". Crystallography Reviews. 12 (2): 125–180. Bibcode:2006CryRv..12..125L. doi:10.1080/08893110600838528.
- Laszlo, Pierre (2010). "Ampère and the "Representative Shape" of Molecules". bibnum.
- Le Bel, J. A. (1874). "Sur les relations qui existent entre les formules atomiques des corps organiques, et le pouvoir rotatoire de leurs dissolutions" [On the relations that exist between the atomic formulas of organic compounds and the rotary power of their solutions]. Bulletin de la Société Chimique de Paris (in French). 22: 337–347.
- Le Bel, J. A. (1963). "On the relations that exist between the atomic formulas of organic compounds and the rotary power of their solutions". In Benfy, O. T. (ed.). Classics in the Theory of Chemical Combinations. New York: Dover. pp. 161–171.
- Lehmann, O. (1889). "Über fliessende Krystalle" [On flowing crystals]. Zeitschrift für Physikalische Chemie (in German). 4 (1): 462–472. doi:10.1515/zpch-1889-0434. S2CID 92908969.
- Lehmann, O. (1904). Flüssige Kristalle sowie Plastizität von Kristallen im allgemeinen, molekulare Umlagerungen und Aggregatzustandsänderungen [Liquid crystals as well as plasticity of crystals in general, molecular replacements and changes in the state of aggregates] (in German). Leipzig: Verlag von Wilhelm Engelmann.
- Lehmann, O. (January 1908). "Zur Geschichte der flüssigen Kristalle" [The history of liquid crystals]. Annalen der Physik (in German). 330 [25] (5): 852–860. Bibcode:1908AnP...330..852L. doi:10.1002/andp.19083300503.
- Lehmann, O. (2004). "On flowing crystals". In Sluckin, Tim; Dunmur, David; Stegemeyer, Horst (eds.). Crystals that flow: classic papers from the history of liquid crystals. London; New York: Taylor & Francis. pp. 42–53. ISBN 978-0-415-25789-3.
- Leslie, Esther (2016). Liquid Crystals: The Science and Art of a Fluid Form (Ebook ed.). London: Reaktion Books. pp. 23–29. ISBN 978-1-78023-693-3.
- Linnaeus, Carl (1806) [1735]. A general system of nature. Vol. 7. London: Lackington, Allen, and Co.
- M., H. A. (21 January 1928). "Prof. P. H. Von Groth, For. Mem. R.S.". Nature. 121 (3038): 98–107. Bibcode:1928Natur.121...98H. doi:10.1038/121098a0.
- Macquer, Pierre-Joseph (1766). "Aggrégation". Dictionnaire de chymie [Dictionary of chemistry] (in French). Vol. 1. Paris: Laurent Durand. pp. 55–57.
- Macquer, Pierre-Joseph (1771). "Aggregation". Dictionary of chemistry. Vol. 1. London: Printed for T. Cadell, and P. Elmsly, in the Strand; J. Robson, in Bond-Street; and S. Bladon, in Paternoster Row. p. 28. "By the integrant parts of a body are to be understood the smallest molecules or particles into which this body can be reduced without decomposition. We may conceive that a neutral salt, for instance common salt, may be divided into molecules still smaller and smaller, without separation of the acid and alkali which constitute the salt; so that these molecules, however small, shall always be common salt, and possessed of all its essential properties. If we should now suppose that these molecules are arrived at their utmost degree of smallness, so that each of them shall be composed of one atom of acid and of another atom of alkali, and that they cannot be further divided without a separation of the acid and the alkali, then these last molecules are those which Mr. Macquer in his Chemical Lectures calls primitive integrant molecules."
- Mainzer, Klaus (1996). Symmetries of nature: a handbook for philosophy of nature and science. Berlin New York: W. de Gruyter. ISBN 3-11-012990-6.
- Malgrange, Cécile; Ricolleau, Christian; Schlenker, Michel (2014). Symmetry and Physical Properties of Crystals. Dordrecht: Springer. ISBN 978-94-017-8992-9.
- Mauskopf, Seymour H. (July 1976). "Crystals and compounds: molecular structure and composition in nineteenth-century French science". Transactions of the American Philosophical Society. New Series. 66 (3): 5–82. doi:10.2307/1006279. ISBN 0-87169-663-0. JSTOR 1006279.
- Mauskopf, Seymour (2006). "A history of chirality". In Busch, Kenneth L.; Busch, Marianna A. (eds.). Chiral analysis. Amsterdam Boston Heidelberg: Elsevier. pp. 3–24. doi:10.1016/B978-044451669-5/50001-6. ISBN 978-0-444-51669-5.
- Mauskopf, Seymour (30 April 2012). "Seeds to Symmetry to Structure: Crystallography and the Search for Atomic-Molecular Arrangement". Crystallography: Defining the Shape of Our Modern World. University of Illinois at Urbana-Champaign.
- Mauskopf, Seymour H. (3 April 2015). "William Barlow and the Determination of Atomic Arrangement in Crystals: Essay in Honour of Alan J. Rocke". Annals of Science. 72 (2): 206–223. doi:10.1080/00033790.2015.1007524. PMID 26104165.
- Melhado, Evan M. (1 January 1980). "Mitscherlich's Discovery of Isomorphism". Historical Studies in the Physical Sciences. 11 (1): 87–123. doi:10.2307/27757472. JSTOR 27757472.
- Melhado, Evan M. (1981). Jacob Berzelius: the emergence of his chemical system. Stockholm: Almqvist & Wiksell. ISBN 91-85286-21-4.
- Metzger, Hélène (1969) [1918]. La Gènese de la Science de Cristaux [The genesis of the science of crystals] (in French). Paris: Albert Blanchard. pp. 67–68. Archived from the original on 2 October 2021.
- Minnigerode, B. (1884). "Untersuchungen über die Symmetrieverhältnisse und die Elasticität der Krystalle" [Investigation of the symmetry relations and elasticity of the crystal]. Nachrichten von der Königl. Gesellschaft der Wissenschaften und der Georg-Augusts-Universität zu Göttingen (in German): 374–384.
- Minnigerode, B. (1886). "Ueber Wärmeleitung in Krystallen" [About heat conduction in crystals]. Neues Jahrbuch für Mineralogie, Geologie und Paläontologie. 1: 1–13.
- Minnigerode, B. (1887). "Untersuchungen über die Symmetrieverhältnisse der Krystalle" [Investigation of the symmetry relations of the crystal]. Neues Jahrbuch für Mineralogie, Geologie und Paläontologie. 5: 145–166.
- Mitov, Michel (19 May 2014). "Liquid-Crystal Science from 1888 to 1922: Building a Revolution". ChemPhysChem. 15 (7): 1245–1250. doi:10.1002/cphc.201301064. PMID 24482315.
- Mitscherlich, E. (1819). "Ueber die Krystallisation der Salze, in denen das Metall der Basis mit zwei Proportionen Sauerstoff verbunden ist" [About the crystallisation of salts in which the base metal is connected with two proportions of oxygen]. Abhandlungen der Königlichen Akademie der Wissenschaften zu Berlin (in German): 427–437. Archived from the original on 12 January 2019.
- Mitscherlich, E. (1821). "Sur la Relation qui existe entre la forme cristalline et les proportions chimique. IIme Mémoire: Sur les Arséniates et les Phosphates" [On the relationship between crystalline form and chemical proportions. Second memoir on arsenates and phosphates]. Annales de chimie et de physique (in French). 19: 350–419.
- Mitscherlich, E. (1823). "Sur la rapport qui existe entre la forme cristalline et les proportions chimique. IIIme Mémoire: Sur les corps qui affectent deux formes cristallines différentes" [On the relationship between crystalline form and chemical proportions. Third memoir on bodies that affect two different crystalline forms]. Annales de chimie et de physique (in French). 24: 264–280.
- Mitscherlich, E. (January 1824). "Ueber das Verhältniss der Form der krystallisirten Körper zur Ausdehnung durch die Wärme" [On the relationship between the form of crystals and their expansion by heat]. Annalen der Physik (in German). 77 [1] (5): 125–127. Bibcode:1824AnP....77..125M. doi:10.1002/andp.18240770507.
- Mohs, F. (1823). "On the crystallographic discoveries and systems of Weiss and Mohs". The Edinburgh Philosophical Journal. 8: 275–290. "But the measurements, or rather the indications of the angles of Haüy, have, in so. many instances, been found incorrect, that we can no longer attach any certainty to their exactness"
- Molčanov, Krešimir; Stilinović, Vladimir (2014). "Chemical Crystallography before X-ray Diffraction". Angewandte Chemie International Edition. 53 (3): 638–652. Bibcode:2014ACIE...53..638M. doi:10.1002/anie.201301319. PMID 24065378.
- Moore, Paul B. (1990). "Brief history of chemical crystallography. I: Inorganic compounds". In Lima-de-Faria, J. (ed.). Historical atlas of crystallography. Dordrecht; Boston: Published for International Union of Crystallography by Kluwer Academic Publishers. pp. 77–90. ISBN 0-7923-0649-X.
- Morse, Edgar W. (1970). "Brewster, David". In Gillispie, Charles Coulston (ed.). Dictionary of scientific biography. Vol. 2. New York: Charles Scribner's Sons. pp. 451–454. ISBN 0-684-16963-0. Archived from the original on 16 November 2010.
- Moser, Tijmen Jan; Robinson, Enders A. (2024). "Anisotropy and Ellipsoidal Wavelets". Walking with Christiaan Huygens: from Archimedes' influence to unsung contributions in modern science. Cham: Springer. pp. 74–80. doi:10.1007/978-3-031-46158-3. ISBN 978-3-031-46157-6.
- Neumann, F. E. (January 1832). "Theorie der doppelten Strahlenbrechung, abgeleitet aus den Gleichungen der Mechanik" [Theory of double beam refraction, derived from the equations of mechanics]. Annalen der Physik (in German). 101 (7): 418–454. Bibcode:1832AnP...101..418N. doi:10.1002/andp.18321010703.
- "Neumann's principle". Online Dictionary of Crystallography. International Union of Crystallography. 16 November 2017.
- Nicol, James (1878). "Crystallography". Encyclopedia Britannica. Vol. 6 (9th ed.). New York: Charles Scribner's Sons. pp. 671–677.
- Oldroyd, D. R. (1 November 1974). "Some Neo-Platonic and Stoic Influences on Mineralogy in the Sixteenth and Seventeenth Centuries". Ambix. 21 (2–3): 128–156. doi:10.1179/000269874790223614.
- Ollis, W. D. (1972). "Models and molecules". Proceedings of the Royal Institution of Great Britain. 45: 1–31.
- Ostwald, W. (1897). "Studien über die Bildung und Umwandlung fester Körper 1. Abhandlung: Übersättigung und Überkaltung" [Studies on the formation and transformation of solid bodies: over-saturation and over-cooling] (PDF). Zeitschrift für Physikalische Chemie (in German). 22U (1): 289–330. doi:10.1515/zpch-1897-2233.
- Pasteur, Louis (1848a). "Mémoire sur la relation qui peut exister entre la forme cristalline et la composition chimique, et sur la cause de la polarisation rotatoire" [Memoir on the relationship which can exist between crystalline form and chemical composition, and on the cause of rotary polarization]. Comptes Rendus de l'Académie des Sciences de Paris (in French). 26: 535–538. Archived from the original on 15 October 2007.
- Pasteur, Louis (1848b). "Sur les relations qui peuvent exister entre la forme cristalline, la composition chimique et le sens de la polarisation rotatoire" [On the relations that can exist between crystalline form, and chemical composition, and the sense of rotary polarization]. Annales de Chimie et de Physique. 3e série (in French). 24: 442–459.
- Pasteur, Louis (1905) [1860]. Researches on the molecular asymmetry of natural organic products. Edinburgh: Alembic Club.
- Paternò, Emmmanuele (1869). "Intorno all'azione del percloruro di fosforo sul clorale" [On the effect of phosphorus perchloride on chloral]. Giornale di scienze naturali ed economiche di Palermo (in Italian). 5: 117–122.
- Paufler, Peter (18 December 2019). "William Barlow's early publications in the 'Zeitschrift für Krystallographie und Mineralogie' and their influence on crystal structure research". Zeitschrift für Kristallographie - Crystalline Materials. 234 (11–12): 769–785. doi:10.1515/zkri-2019-0044.
- Pauling, Linus (1981). "Historical Perspective". In O'Keeffe, Michael; Navrotsky, Alexandra (eds.). Structure and Bonding in Crystals. Vol. 1. Academic Press. pp. 1–12. doi:10.1016/B978-0-12-525101-3.50007-3. ISBN 978-0-12-525101-3.
- Phillips, F. C. (1963). An Introduction To Crystallography (3rd ed.). New York: John Wiley & Sons. pp. 12–14.
- "Polymorphism". Online Dictionary of Crystallography. International Union of Crystallography. 13 March 2018.
- Ramberg, Peter J. (2003). Chemical structure, spatial arrangement: the early history of stereochemistry, 1874-1914. Aldershot, England; Burlington, VT: Ashgate. ISBN 0-7546-0397-0.
- Reinitzer, Friedrich (December 1888). "Beiträge zur Kenntniss des Cholesterins" [Contributions to the understanding of chloresterol]. Monatshefte für Chemie (in German). 9 (1): 421–441. doi:10.1007/bf01516710. S2CID 97166902. Archived from the original on 4 November 2022.
- Reinitzer, Fr. (January 1908). "Zur Geschichte der flüssigen Kristalle" [The history of liquid crystals]. Annalen der Physik (in German). 332 [27] (11): 213–224. Bibcode:1908AnP...332..213R. doi:10.1002/andp.19083321111.
- Reinitzer, Friedrich (2004). "Contributions to the understanding of chloresterol". In Sluckin, Tim; Dunmur, David; Stegemeyer, Horst (eds.). Crystals that flow: classic papers from the history of liquid crystals. London; New York: Taylor & Francis. pp. 26–41. ISBN 978-0-415-25789-3.
- Richardson, George M., ed. (1901). The Foundations of Stereochemistry: Memoirs by Pasteur, Van't Hoff, Lebel, and Wislicenus. New York; Cincinnati; Chicago: American Book Company.
- Riddell, F. G.; Robinson, M. J. T. (January 1974). "J. H. van't Hoff and J. A. Le Bel—their historical context". Tetrahedron. 30 (13): 2001–2007. doi:10.1016/S0040-4020(01)97330-2.
- Robertson, Edmund F.; O'Connor, John J. "The MacTutor History of Mathematics Archive: Biographies". School of Mathematics and Statistics, University of St Andrews.
- Rocke, Alan J. (1993). The quiet revolution: Hermann Kolbe and the science of organic chemistry. Berkeley Los Angeles London: University of California press. ISBN 0-520-08110-2.
- Rocke, Alan J. (2010). "Dimensional Molecules". Image and reality: Kekulé, Kopp, and the scientific imagination. Chicago: The University of Chicago Press. pp. 228–260. ISBN 978-0-226-72332-7.
- Romé de L'Isle, Jean Baptiste Louis de (1772). Essai de cristallographie: ou, Description des figures géométriques, propres à différens corps du regne minéral connus vulgairement sous le nom de Cristaux [Crystallographic essay, or, Description of geometric figures, specific to different bodies of the mineral kingdom known vulgarly as crystals] (in French). Paris: Didot jeune. p. 10. "Germs being inadmissible for explaining the formation of crystals, it is necessary to suppose that the integrant molecules of bodies have each, according to its own nature, a constant and determinate figure. [translation]"
- Romé de L'Isle, Jean Baptiste Louis de (1783). Cristallographie, ou, Description des formes propres à tous les corps du regne minéral [Crystallography, or, Description of the forms specific to all bodies in the mineral kingdom] (in French). Paris: De l'imprimerie de Monsieur.
- Rouelle, G.-F. (1745). "Sur la crystallisation du sel marin" [On the crystallization of sea salt]. Histoire de l'Académie Royale des Sciences (in French): 32–34.
- Rowlinson, J.S. (2002). Cohesion: A Scientific History of Intermolecular Forces. Cambridge University Press. ISBN 978-1-139-43588-8. Archived from the original on 13 April 2022.
- Sackmann, H. (July 1989). "Plenary Lecture. Smectic liquid crystals. A historical review". Liquid Crystals. 5 (1): 43–55. Bibcode:1989LoCr....5...43S. doi:10.1080/02678298908026351.
- Salvia, Stefano (August 2013). "Emil Wohlwill's "Entdeckung des Isomorphismus": A Nineteenth-Century "Material Biography" of Crystallography". Ambix. 60 (3): 255–284. doi:10.1179/0002698013Z.00000000033.
- Schenck, R. (15 December 1905). "Über die Natur der Kristallinischen Flüssigkeiten und der flüssigen Kristalle" [On crystalline liquids and liquid crystals]. Zeitschrift für Elektrochemie und angewandte physikalische Chemie (in German). 11 (50): 951–955. doi:10.1002/bbpc.19050115012.
- "Justus von Liebig and Friedrich Wöhler". Science History Institute. June 2016.
- Scholz, Erhard (1989a). "Crystallographic Symmetry Concepts and Group Theory (1850–1860)". In Rowe, David E.; McCleary, John (eds.). The history of modern mathematics: proceedings of the Symposium on the history of modern mathematics, Vassar college, Poughkeepsie, New York, June 20-24, 1988. New York London Toronto: Academic Press. pp. 3–27. ISBN 0-12-599662-4.
- Scholz, Erhard (1989b). "The rise of Symmetry Concepts in the Atomistic and Dynamistic Schools of Crystallography, 1815-1830". Revue d'histoire des sciences. 42 (1–2): 110–112. doi:10.3406/rhs.1989.4136.
- Scholz, Erhard (1994). "Crystallography". In Grattan-Guinness, I. (ed.). Companion Encyclopedia of the History and Philosophy of the Mathematical Sciences. Vol. 2. London: Routledge. pp. 1269–1274. ISBN 978-0-415-09239-5.
- Schuh, Curtis P. (2007a). Mineralogy & Crystallography: On the History of these Sciences through 1919. Curtis Schuh.
- Schütt, Hans-Werner (1984). Die Entdeckung des Isomorphismus: eine Fallstudie zur Geschichte der Mineralogie und der Chemie [The discovery of isomorphism: a case study in the history of mineralogy and chemistry] (in German). Hildesheim: Gerstenberg Verlag. ISBN 3-8067-0902-5.
- Schütt, Hans-Werner (1997). Eilhard Mitscherlich: prince of Prussian chemistry. Washington, DC: American Chemical Society and the Chemical Heritage Foundation. ISBN 0-8412-3345-4.
- Senechal, Marjorie (1990a). "Brief history of geometrical crystallography". In Lima-de-Faria, J. (ed.). Historical atlas of crystallography. Dordrecht; Boston: Published for International Union of Crystallography by Kluwer Academic Publishers. p. 44. ISBN 0-7923-0649-X.
- Shenstone, William Ashwell (1901). Justus von Liebig, his life and work (1803–1873). London: Cassell.
- Shubnikov, A. V. (1988). "On the works of Pierre Curie on symmetry". In Hargittai, I.; Vainshtein, B. K. (eds.). Crystal symmetries: Shubnikov centennial papers. Oxford New York Beijing: Pergamon Press. pp. 357–364. doi:10.1016/0898-1221(88)90225-8. ISBN 0-08-037014-4.
- Shubnikov, A. V.; Kopt︠s︡ik, V. A. (1974). Harker, David (ed.). Symmetry in science and art. Translated by Archard, G. D. New York: Plenum Press. ISBN 0-306-30759-6.
- Sluckin, Tim; Dunmur, David; Stegemeyer, Horst (2004). Crystals that flow: classic papers from the history of liquid crystals. Boca Raton: CRC Press, Taylor & Francis Group. ISBN 978-0-415-25789-3.
- Sohncke, L. (1884). "Probable Nature of the Internal Symmetry of Crystals". Nature. 29 (747): 383–384. Bibcode:1884Natur..29..383S. doi:10.1038/029383a0. S2CID 4072817.
- Sollas, W. (1898). "On the intimate structure of crystals. Parts I, II & III. Crystals of the cubic system with cubic cleavage". Proceedings of the Royal Society of London. 63: 270–300. doi:10.1098/rspl.1898.0035.
- Steno, Nicolas (1669). De solido intra solidum naturaliter contento (in Latin). Florence: Star.
- Steno, Nicolaus (1916) [1669]. The prodromus of Nicolaus Steno's dissertation concerning a solid body enclosed by process of nature within a solid. Translated by Winter, John Garrett. New York, London: The Macmillan Company. p. 272. "Figures 5 and 6 belong to the class of those which I could present in countless numbers to prove that in the plane of the axis both the number and the length of the sides are changed in various ways without changing the angles."
- Stillwell, Charles W. (1938). Crystal chemistry. New York and London: McGraw-Hill Book Company.
- Szabadváry, F. (1974). "Mitscherlich, Eilhard". In Gillispie, Charles Coulston (ed.). Dictionary of scientific biography. Vol. 9. New York: Scribner. pp. 423–426. ISBN 0-684-10120-3. Archived from the original on 13 August 2020.
- Szpiro, George (2003). Kepler's conjecture: how some of the greatest minds in history helped solve one of the oldest math problems in the world. Hoboken, N.J: John Wiley & Sons. ISBN 978-0-471-08601-7.
- Taylor, Kenneth L. (1978). "Delafosse, Gabriel". In Gillispie, Charles Coulston (ed.). Dictionary of scientific biography: Topical essays. Vol. 15 (Supplement 1). New York: C. Scribner's sons. pp. 114–115. ISBN 0-684-14779-3. Archived from the original on 19 September 2020.
- "The Evolution of the Goniometer". Nature. 95 (2386): 564–565. 1 July 1915. Bibcode:1915Natur..95..564.. doi:10.1038/095564a0. ISSN 1476-4687.
- Thomson, William (1904). "On the molecular tactics of a crystal". Baltimore Lectures on Molecular Dynamics and the Wave Theory of Light. London: C. J. Clay and Sons. pp. 602–642. "I call any geometric figure, or group of points, chiral and say it has chirality if its image in a plane mirror cannot be brought to coincide with itself."
- Threlfall, T. (2003). "Structural and thermodynamic explanations of Ostwald's Rule". Organic Process Research & Development. 7 (6): 1017–1027. doi:10.1021/op030026l. ISSN 1083-6160.
- Tutton, A. E. H. (1911). "The work of Eilhardt Mitscherlich and his discovery of isomorphism". Crystals. London: Kegan Paul, Trench, Trubner & Co. Ltd. pp. 70–97.
- Tutton, A. E. H. (1922). Crystallography and practical crystal measurement. Vol. 2. London: Macmillan.
- Usselman, Melvyn C. (1986). "The Reflective Goniometer and its Impact on Chemical Theory". In Stock, J. T.; Orna, M. V. (eds.). The History and Preservation of Chemical Instrumentation. pp. 33–40. doi:10.1007/978-94-009-4690-3_4. ISBN 978-94-010-8585-4.
- Usselman, Melvyn C. (2015). Pure intelligence: the life of William Hyde Wollaston. Chicago; London: The University of Chicago Press. ISBN 978-0-226-24573-7.
- van 't Hoff, J. H. (1874). Voorstel tot uitbreiding der tegenwoordig in de scheikunde gebruikte structuur-formules in de ruimte; benevens een daarmee samenhangende opmerking omtrent het verband tusschen optisch actief vermogen en chemische constitutie van organische verbindingen [Proposal to extend the structural formulas in space used today in chemistry; in addition to a related comment regarding the relationship between optical active power and chemical constitution of organic compounds] (in Dutch). Utrecht: J. Greven.
- van 't Hoff, J. H. (1898). The arrangement of atoms in space. London: Longman, Green and Co.
- Van Stanten, R. A. (1 November 1984). "The Ostwald step rule" (PDF). Journal of Physical Chemistry. 88 (24): 5768–5769. doi:10.1021/j150668a002.
- Vorländer, D. (January 1906). "Ueber krystallinisch-flüssige Substanzen" [On crystalline-liquid substances]. Berichte der Deutschen Chemischen Gesellschaft (in German). 39 (1): 803–810. doi:10.1002/cber.190603901126.
- Vorländer, D. (March 1907). "Einfluß der molekularen Gestalt auf den krystallinisch-flüssigen Zustand" [Influence of molecular configuration on the crystalline-liquid state]. Berichte der Deutschen Chemischen Gesellschaft (in German). 40 (2): 1970–1972. doi:10.1002/cber.190704002101.
- Wahl, Walter (2 June 1913). "The relation between the crystal-symmetry of the simpler organic compounds and their molecular constitution.—Part I". Proceedings of the Royal Society of London. Series A, Containing Papers of a Mathematical and Physical Character. 88 (604): 354–361. Bibcode:1913RSPSA..88..354W. doi:10.1098/rspa.1913.0036. JSTOR 93436.
- Westfeld, Christian Friedrich Gotthard (1767). Mineralogische Abhandlungen [Mineralogical Papers] (in German). Göttingen und Gotha: J. C. Dieterich. doi:10.3931/e-rara-50829.
- Whewell, William (2011) [1837]. "Prelude to the Epoch of De L'Isle and Haüy". History of the Inductive Sciences: From the Earliest to the Present Times (Online ed.). Cambridge: Cambridge University Press. pp. 191–197. doi:10.1017/cbo9780511734359.027. ISBN 978-1-108-01926-2. "Nevertheless since there is here a principle of crystallization, the inclination of the planes and of the angles is always constant."
- "Wilhelm Ostwald Biographical". nobelprize.org. Nobel Media AB.
- Wislicenus, Johannes (1887). "Ueber die räumliche Anordnung der Atome in organischen Molekülen und ihre Bestimmung in geometrischisomeren ungesättigten Verbindungen" [On the spatial arrangement of atoms in organic molecules and their determination in geometrically isomeric unsaturated compounds]. Abhandlungen der Mathematisch-Physischen Classe der Königlich Sächsischen Gesellschaft der Wissenschaften (in German). 14: 1–78.
- Wöhler, F.; Liebig, J. (1832). "Unter suchengen über das Radikal der Benzosäure" [On the search for the radical of benzoic acid]. Annalen der Pharmacie (in German). 3 (3): 249–282. doi:10.1002/jlac.18320030302. hdl:2027/hvd.hxdg3f.
- Wohlwill, Emil (1866). "Die Entdeckung des Isomorphismus. Eine Studie zur Geschichte der Chemie" [The discovery of isomorphism, a study in the history of chemistry]. Zeitschrift für Völkerpsychologie und Sprachwissenschaft (in German). 4: 1–67.
- Wollaston, William Hyde (1809). "Description of a reflective goniometer". Philosophical Transactions of the Royal Society of London. 99: 253–258. doi:10.1098/rstl.1809.0018.
- Wollaston, William Hyde (31 December 1813). "The Bakerian Lecture. On the elementary particles of certain crystals". Philosophical Transactions of the Royal Society of London. 103: 51–63. doi:10.1098/rstl.1813.0008. JSTOR 107387.
- Wyart, Jean (1971). "Curie, Pierre". In Gillispie, Charles Coulston (ed.). Dictionary of scientific biography. Vol. 3. New York: Scribner. pp. 503–508. ISBN 0-684-16964-9. Archived from the original on 23 February 2024.
- Zimmer, Carl (12 June 2025). "Shining a Light on the World of Tiny Proteins". New York Times.
