= Friedrich Reinitzer =

Austrian botanist and chemist (1857–1927)

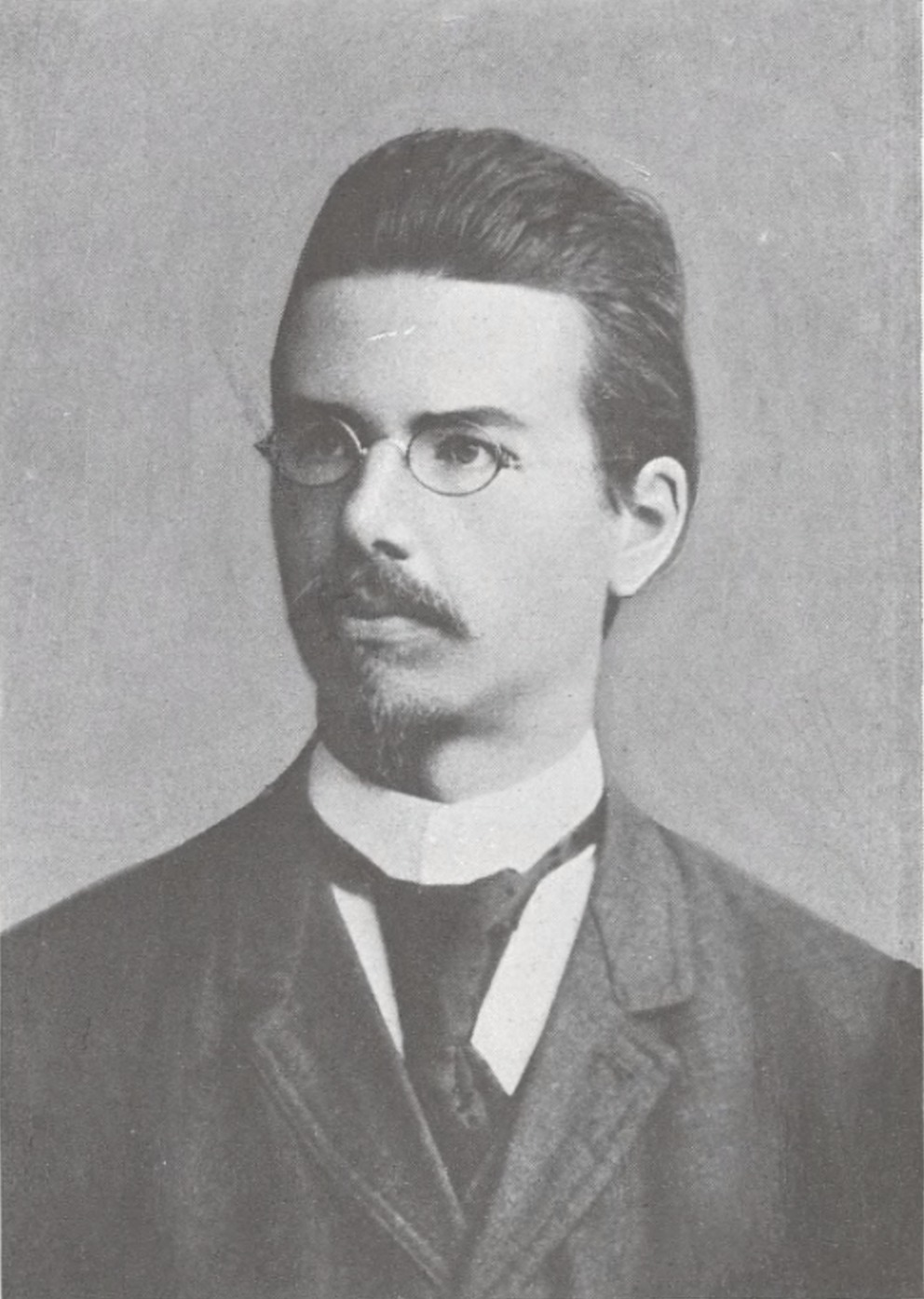
- Born: 25 February 1857; Prague
- Died: 16 February 1927 (aged 69); Graz

Friedrich Richard Reinitzer (25 February 1857 – 16 February 1927) was an Austrian botanist and organic chemist. In late the 1880s, when experimenting with a plant derived substance known as cholesteryl benzoate, he accidentally discovered some of the properties of liquid crystals (named later by Otto Lehmann).

Reinitzer was born into a German Bohemian family in Prague. He studied chemistry at the German technical university in Prague; in 1883 he was habilitated there as a private docent. From 1888-1901 he was a professor first at Karl-Ferdinands-Universität, then at the technical university in Graz. During 1909 - 1910 he served as the rector of the university. He died in Graz.

While at Karl-Ferdinands-Universität in 1888 he discovered a strange behaviour of what would later be called liquid crystals. For the explanation of their behaviour he collaborated with the physicist Otto Lehmann from Aachen. The discovery received plenty of attention at the time but no practical uses were apparent and the interest soon dropped.

== Selected works ==
- F. Reinitzer (1888) "Beiträge zur Kenntnis des Cholesterins", Monatshefte für Chemie 9:421–41.
- F. Reinitzer (1891) "Der Gerbstoffbegriff und seine Beziehung zur Pflanzenchemie", Lotos 39.

== See also ==
- Chemical crystallography before X-rays
