= Para-Azoxyanisole =

para-Azoxyanisole
- Para-Azoxyanisole

Names
- IUPAC name 1-Methoxy-4-[(4-methoxyphenyl)-NNO-azoxy]benzene
- Other names p-Azoxyanisole

Identifiers
CAS Number	1562-94-3
3D model (JSmol)	Interactive image
ChemSpider	14542
PubChem CID	15277
UNII	4G08S4XUIX
- InChI: InChI=1S/C14H14N2O3/c1-18-13-7-3-11(4-8-13)15-16(17)12-5-9-14(19-2)10-6-12/h3-10H,1-2H3/b16-15- Key: KAEZRSFWWCTVNP-NXVVXOECSA-N; InChI=1/C14H14N2O3/c1-18-13-7-3-11(4-8-13)15-16(17)12-5-9-14(19-2)10-6-12/h3-10H,1-2H3/b16-15- Key: KAEZRSFWWCTVNP-NXVVXOECBU
- SMILES: COc2ccc(\N=[N+](/[O-])c1ccc(OC)cc1)cc2

Properties
Chemical formula	C_{14}H_{14}N_{2}O_{3}
Molar mass	258.277 g·mol^{−1}
Density	1.14 g/cm^{3}
Melting point	114.9 °C (238.8 °F; 388.0 K)
Boiling point	417.9 °C (784.2 °F; 691.0 K) at 760 mmHg

Hazards
Flash point	206.6 °C (403.9 °F; 479.8 K)
- Except where otherwise noted, data are given for materials in their standard state (at 25 °C [77 °F], 100 kPa). verify (what is ?) Infobox references

para-Azoxyanisole (PAA) is an organic, aromatic compound. Its chemical formula is C_{14}H_{14}N_{2}O_{3}. In a solid state, it appears as a white powder, but when heated it forms a liquid crystal. As one of the first known and most readily prepared liquid crystals, PAA has played an important role in the development of liquid crystal displays.

Its liquid crystal range is from 118 °C to 136 °C. The solid to nematic transition is at 118 °C and the nematic to isotropic liquid transition at 136 °C.

== See also ==
- Chemical crystallography before X-rays
