= Isomorphism (crystallography) =

Similarity of symmetry and shape

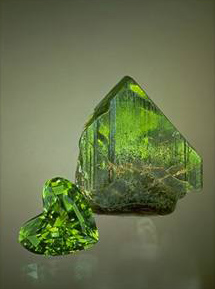
Forsterite

In chemistry, isomorphism has meanings both at the level of crystallography and at a molecular level. In crystallography, crystals are isomorphous if they have identical symmetry and if the atomic positions can be described with a set of parameters (unit cell dimensions and fractional coordinates) whose numerical values differ only slightly.

Molecules are isomorphous if they have similar shapes. The coordination complexes tris(acetylacetonato)iron (Fe(acac)_{3}) and tris(acetylacetonato)aluminium (Al(acac)_{3}) are isomorphous. These compounds, both of D_{3} symmetry have very similar shapes, as determined by bond lengths and bond angles. Isomorphous compounds give rise to isomorphous crystals and form solid solutions. Historically, crystal shape was defined by measuring the angles between crystal faces with a goniometer. Whereas crystals of Fe(acac)_{3} are deep red and crystals of Al(acac)_{3} are colorless, a solid solution of the two, i.e. Fe_{1−x}Al_{x}(acac)_{3} will be deep or pale pink depending on the Fe/Al ratio, x.

Double sulfates, such as Tutton's salt, with the generic formula M^{I}_{2}M^{II}(SO_{4})_{2}.6H_{2}O, where M^{I} is an alkali metal and M^{II} is a divalent ion of Mg, Mn, Fe, Co, Ni, Cu or Zn, form a series of isomorphous compounds which were important in the nineteenth century in establishing the correct atomic weights of the transition elements. Alums, such as KAl(SO_{4})_{2}.12H_{2}O, are another series of isomorphous compounds, though there are three series of alums with similar external structures, but slightly different internal structures. Many spinels are also isomorphous.

In order to form isomorphous crystals two substances must have the same chemical formulation (i.e., atoms in the same ratio), they must contain atoms which have corresponding chemical properties and the sizes of corresponding atoms should be similar. These requirements ensure that the forces within and between molecules and ions are approximately similar and result in crystals that have the same internal structure. Even though the space group is the same, the unit cell dimensions will be slightly different because of the different sizes of the atoms involved.

== Mitscherlich's law ==
Mitscherlich's law of isomorphism, or the law of isomorphism, is an approximate law suggesting that crystals composed of the same number of similar elements tend to demonstrate isomorphism.

Isomorphous relationships are also observed in organic solvates; for instance, a 2019 study reported a novel case of isomorphism between an 18-crown-6 hydrazine disolvate and its tetrahydrate, where hydrazine is structurally substituted by water molecules.

Mitscherlich's law is named for German chemist Eilhard Mitscherlich, who formulated the law and published it between 1819 and 1823.

According to Ferenc Szabadváry, one of the clues that helped Berzelius determine the atomic weights of the elements was "the discovery of Mitscherlich that compounds which contain the same number of atoms and have similar structures, exhibit similar crystal forms (isomorphism)."

== See also ==
- Asterism (gemology)
- Polymorphism (materials science)
- Goldschmidt tolerance factor
- Solid solution
- Vegard's law
- Chemical crystallography before X-rays
