= Paul Heinrich von Groth =

German mineralogist (1843–1927)

Paul Heinrich Ritter von Groth
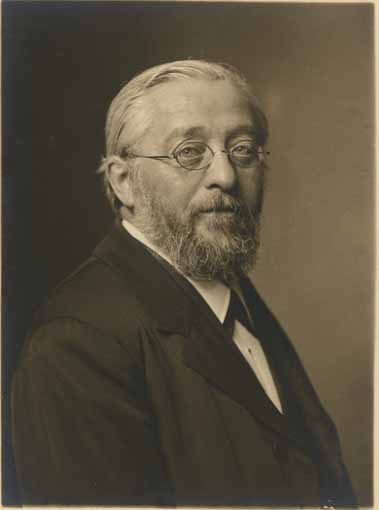
- Photograph by Theodor Hilsdorf (1910)
- Born: June 23, 1843; Magdeburg, Germany
- Died: December 2, 1927 (aged 84); Munich, Germany
- Education: Friedrich Wilhelm University of Berlin
- Scientific career
- Institutions: Freiberg Mining School; Friedrich Wilhelm University of Berlin; University of Strasbourg; Ludwig-Maximilians-Universität München
- Doctoral advisor: Heinrich Gustav Magnus
- Other academic advisors: Gustav Rose
- Doctoral students: Waldemar Theodore Schaller
- Other notable students: Vladimir Vernadsky; Vojtěch Rosický

Paul Heinrich Ritter von Groth (23 June 1843 – 2 December 1927) was a German mineralogist. His most important contribution to science was his systematic classification of minerals based on their chemical compositions and crystal structures.

== Biography ==
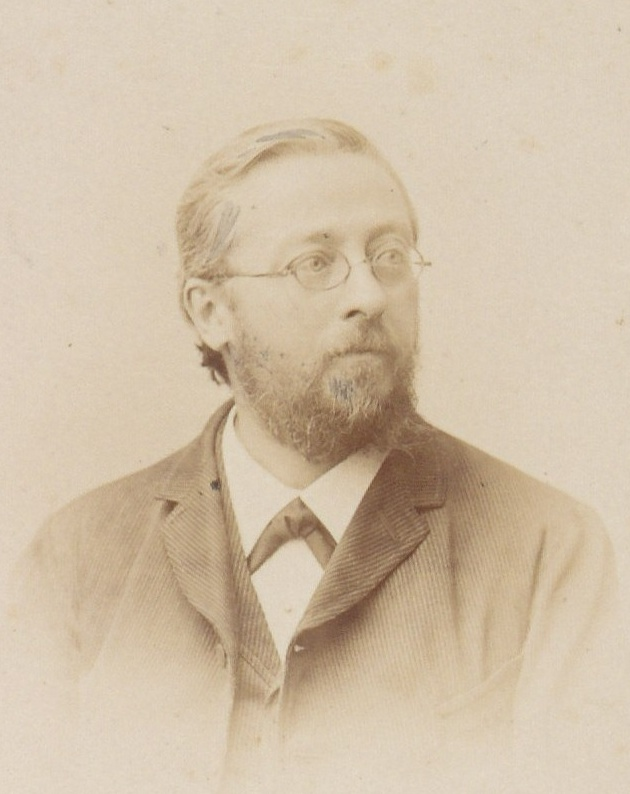
Paul Heinrich von Groth, c. 1898

He was born at Magdeburg, and educated at the Freiberg University of Mining and Technology, TU Dresden, and the Friedrich Wilhelm University of Berlin, and received the doctorate degree in 1868. After lecturing at the Freiberg mining school and at the Friedrich Wilhelm University of Berlin, in 1872, he became professor of mineralogy at the University of Strasbourg. In 1883, he was appointed professor of mineralogy and curator of minerals in the Deutsches Museum in Munich.

He died in Munich.

== Work ==
He carried out extensive research on crystals and minerals, and also on rocks. von Groth published Tabellarische Übersicht der einfachen Mineralien (1874-1898) and Physikalische Krystallographie (1876-1895, ed. 4, 1905), the latter of which was influential with the acceptance of crystallographic methods in the field of organic chemistry. In 1877, he founded the journal Zeitschrift für Krystallographie und Mineralogie, and subsequently served as its editor until 1920. In 1883, Groth compiled a monumental five-volume collection entitled Chemische Kristallographie, which contained crystalline morphology and physical property data on thousands of substances.

By Groth's time, Dalton's atomic theory was already well established. In 1888, Groth was the first to suggest the possibility that spherical atoms reside at equivalent positions of space lattices, which gave a physical significance to this still somewhat abstract idea of the regular and symmetric partitioning of space. The German physicist Leonhard Sohncke (1842–1897) had previously derived the 65 chiral space groups (i.e. those lacking an inversion center, mirror planes, or improper axes of rotation that invert the handedness of a crystal). The mathematical descriptions of the complete set of 230 space groups, including their symmetry elements, were thereafter derived independently by Schönflies, Fedorov, and Barlow. Finally, in 1922, Ralph Walter Graystone Wyckoff (1897–1994) authored The Analytical Expression of the Results of the Theory of Space Groups, a book which contained, among other things, tables with the positional coordinates, both general and special, permitted by the symmetry elements.

== Publications ==
=== as author ===
- Elemente der physikalischen und chemischen Krystallographie (R. Oldenbourg, 1921)
- Physikalische Krystallographie und Einleitung in die krystallographische Kenntniss der wichtigsten Subtanzen (W. Engelmann, 1905)
- Ueber die Molekularbeschaffenheit der Krystalle. Festrede gehalten in der öffentlichen Sitzung der k.b. Akademie der Wissenschaften zu München zur Feier des einhundert und neunundzwanzigsten Stiftungstages am 28 März 1888 (Munich, 1888)
- Über das studium der Mineralogie auf den Deutschen Hochschulen (London, Trübner & Co, 1875)

== See also ==
- Chemical crystallography before X-rays
- Geometrical crystallography before X-rays
- Physical crystallography before X-rays
