= Aluminium acetylacetonate =

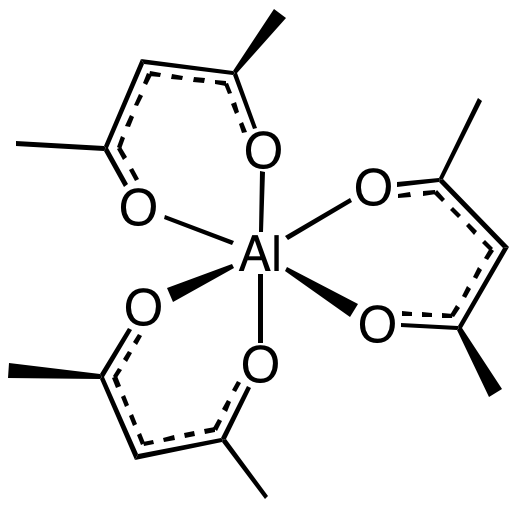

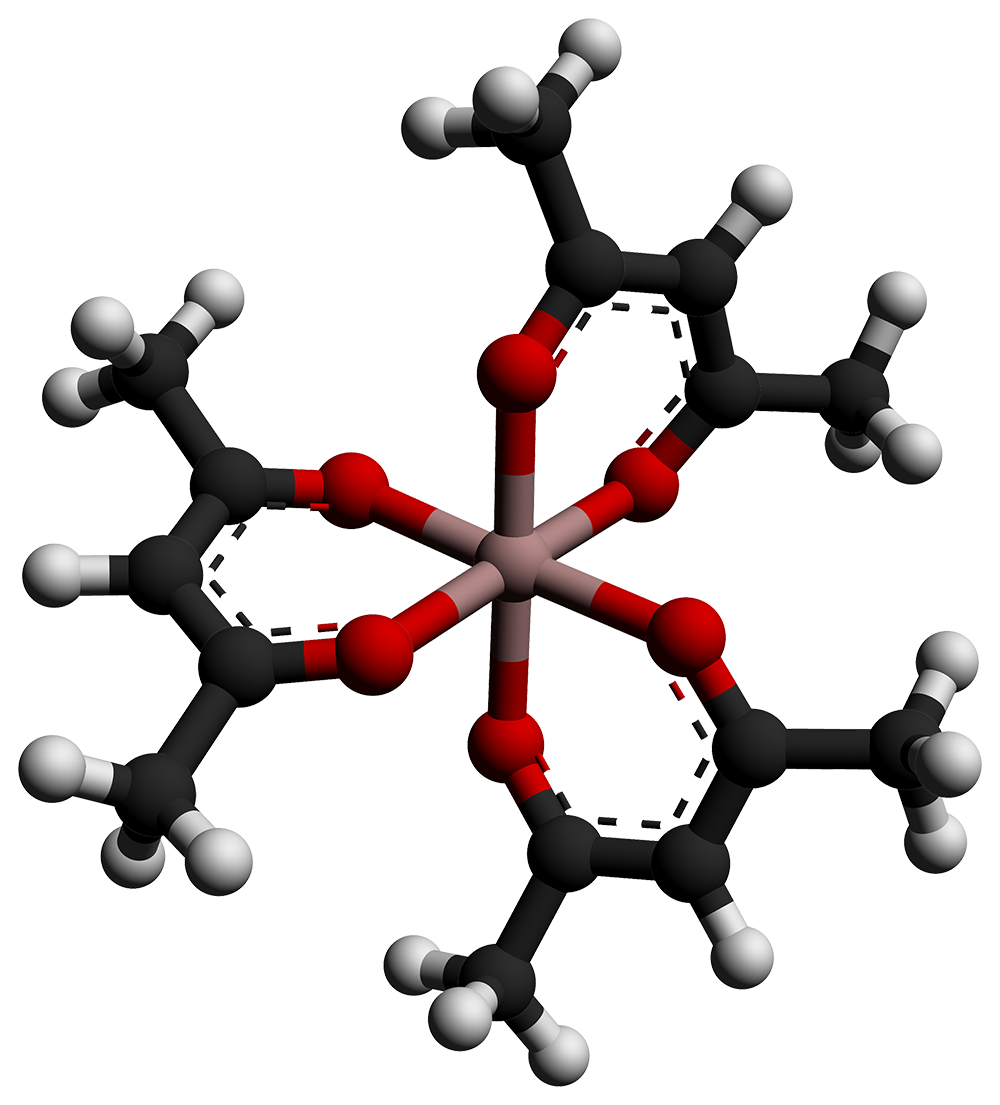

Names
- IUPAC name (Z)-4-Bis{[(Z)-4-oxopent-2-en-2-yl]oxy}alumanyloxypent-3-en-2-one
- Other names Aluminium acetylacetonate, aluminium acetylacetonate

Identifiers
CAS Number	13963-57-0
3D model (JSmol)	Interactive image
ChemSpider	10616907; 21106084
ECHA InfoCard	100.034.296
EC Number	237-741-6
PubChem CID	16683006
UNII	77S22ZW4U3
CompTox Dashboard (EPA)	DTXSID8051704
- InChI: InChI=1S/3C5H8O2.Al/c3*1-4(6)3-5(2)7;/h3*3,6H,1-2H3;/q;;;+3/p-3/b3*4-3-; Key: KILURZWTCGSYRE-LNTINUHCSA-K
- SMILES: C/C(=C/C(=O)C)/O[Al](O/C(=C\C(=O)C)/C)O/C(=C\C(=O)C)/C

Properties
Chemical formula	Al(C_{5}H_{7}O_{2})_{3}
Molar mass	324.31 g/mol
Appearance	White solid
Density	1.42 g/cm^{3}
Melting point	190-193 °C
Boiling point	315 °C
Solubility in water	Low
- Except where otherwise noted, data are given for materials in their standard state (at 25 °C [77 °F], 100 kPa). Infobox references

Aluminium acetylacetonate, also referred to as Al(acac)_{3}, is a coordination complex with formula Al(C_{5}H_{7}O_{2})_{3}. This aluminium complex with three acetylacetone ligands is used in research on Al-containing materials. The molecule has D_{3} symmetry, being isomorphous with other octahedral tris(acetylacetonate)s.

== Uses ==
Aluminium acetylacetonate can be used as the precursor to crystalline aluminium oxide films using low-pressure metal organic chemical vapour deposition. In horticulture it can also be used as a molluscicide.
