= Valentin Rose =

Valentin Rose may refer to:

- Valentin Rose the Elder (1736–1771), pharmacist
- Valentin Rose (pharmacologist) (1762–1807), his son, German pharmacologist
- Valentin Rose (classicist) (1829–1916), German classicist and textual critic
