= Moritz Traube =

German biochemist (1826–1894)

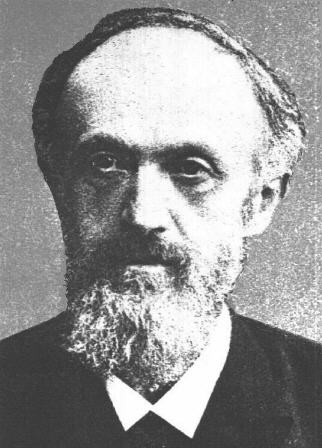
Portrait of Moritz Traube

Moritz Traube (12 February 1826 – 28 June 1894) was a German chemist and universal private scholar.

Traube worked on chemical, biochemical, medical, physiological, pathophysiological problems. He was engaged in hygienics, physical chemistry and basic chemical research. Although he was never a staff member of a university and earned his living as a wine merchant, he was able to refute theories of his leading contemporaries, including Justus von Liebig, Louis Pasteur, Felix Hoppe-Seyler and Julius Sachs, and to develop significant theories of his own with solid experimental foundations. The chemistry of oxygen and its significance to the organism were the central objects of his research and provided the common thread uniting almost all of his scientific activity.

Moritz Traube was a younger brother of the famous Berlin physician Ludwig Traube (physician), the co-founder of the German experimental pathology. A son, Wilhelm Traube, evolved a process of purine synthesis. Hermann Traube, another son, was a mineralogist.

== Biography ==
=== Education period ===
Traube was born on 12 February 1826 in Ratibor, Silesia, Prussia (now Racibórz, Poland). Traube's father was a Jewish wine merchant, the grandson of a rabbi from Kraków. Traube graduated from the Gymnasium in the provincial town of Ratibor when he was only 16 years old. His older brother Ludwig advised him to begin scientific studies at the University of Berlin (1842–1844). He studied experimental chemistry with Eilhard Mitscherlich, chemistry and stoichiometry with Heinrich Rose, mineralogy with Christian Samuel Weiss, physics with Heinrich Wilhelm Dove; and practised experimental chemistry in the laboratory of Karl Friedrich August Rammelsberg.

He moved to Giessen to participate in Liebig's practical-analytical course in 1844/45. He attended lectures in botany (Hermann Hoffmann) and logic (Moritz Carrière). In 1845 he returned to Berlin (geology with Heinrich Girard). In 1847 he received his doctorate with a thesis entitled "De nonnullis chromii connubiis". The later well-known botanist Nathanael Pringsheim supported him. For a while Traube worked in a Berlin dyeworks (1848/49), then continued his studies: anatomy with Friedrich Schlemm, physiology and comparative anatomy with Johannes Müller, pathology with Rudolf Virchow and pharmacology with Eilhard Mitscherlich. For a few weeks he attended lectures in clinical disciplines such as surgery (with Bernhard von Langenbeck) and auscultation and percussion (Ludwig Traube). The extraordinarily wide spectrum of his qualifications was a basis of his universal research.

=== The period in Ratibor (1849–1866) ===
When another brother, who was to have taken over their father's wine business, suddenly died of diabetes, Traube's father ordered him home to Ratibor to help manage the business. After agonizing for several weeks, Traube complied. But he could not abandon science.

In a poorly-heated attic of his house, lacking time and money, isolated from scientific communication, he developed his extensive chemical-physiological projects. He completed numerous well-planned, accurately executed experiments, the correctness of which his contemporaries were forced to acknowledge.

Traube was also successful as a wine merchant. Together with his brother Ludwig he donated 500 Taler to the Ratibor Gymnasium for students' prizes. He married Bertha Moll of Lissa in 1855. The marriage produced 3 daughters and 2 sons.

=== The period in Breslau (1866–1891) ===
To facilitate his research Traube moved to Breslau. He worked for a time in the laboratory of his friend Theodor Poleck and in the Physiological Institute of Rudolf Heidenhain. Later he erected his own, well equipped laboratory and employed assistants. Every year he travelled to Hungary to survey and purchase wine himself. One of his customers was Otto von Bismarck. In 1886 Traube resigned from business. From 1866 to 1890 he was a member of the "Schlesische Gesellschaft für vaterländische Kultur“. He was elected to the board of this society in 1884.

=== The period in Berlin (1891–1894) ===
When Traube came to Berlin, he was already ill, probably from diabetes and coronary ischaemia. Here his two sons were employed at the university. He worked tirelessly even in the last year of his life. His death attracted great attention. He was laid to rest in the cemetery in Gudrunstrasse, Berlin-Lichtenberg. On the grave, no longer preserved, stood a bronze bust by the sculptor Fritz Schaper. The gypsum model survives in the Alte Nationalgalerie in Berlin.

Traube died on 28 June 1894 in Berlin, at the age of 68.

== Scientific achievements ==
=== Medicine and clinical chemistry ===
Traube showed that sugar excretion in the urine of a diabetic patient rose after starch intake but fell after protein consumption. Additionally he demonstrated the unrestricted intestinal absorption of fats in diabetics. He thus contributed to the scientific basis for a diabetic diet. For diagnosis he proposed to measure sugar levels at specific, regular intervals: in the morning before breakfast and after meals. He thus anticipated modern principles of blood sugar measurements. Elsewhere he investigated the laxative qualities of lactose.

=== Theory of fermentation ===
Traube's main work, the Theorie der Fermentwirkungen (1858) is the first comprehensive theory of fermentation to be based on experiments and elaborated consequently from the chemical point of view. The discovery in 1837 that yeast was a living organism suggested that fermentation itself was a living process. Only a few scientists rejected this vitalistic protoplasm theory, notably Traube. He was the first to define enzymes as specific protein-like compounds and to formulate the necessity of direct molecular contact between enzyme and substrate for fermentation to occur. He classified enzymes by reaction type, much as is done today. Long before Eduard Buchner discovered non-cellular fermentation in 1897, Traube isolated an enzyme from potatoes which could turn guaiacum blue, thus demonstrating the continued efficacy of plant enzymes after they had been extracted from the cell. Until recently, biochemical history has not noted that Traube began to investigate the kinetics of reactions and also demonstrated a reciprocal relationship between reaction time and quantity of enzyme. To defend his theory, Traube had to argue vigorously against Louis Pasteur and Felix Hoppe-Seyler. He contradicted Pasteur's assertion that fermentation could not occur without vital activity. In the context of these experiments Traube became the first to describe a process for making pure yeast. His differences with Hoppe-Seyler had to do with the mechanism by which oxygen was activated in fermentation reactions. Traube's experiments were designed to demonstrate activation via enzymes as catalysts and refute Hoppe-Seyler's hypothesis of oxygen activation by nascent hydrogen produced by enzymes.

=== Physiology of plants and the invention of artificial semipermeable membranes ===
In 1864 Traube was the first to produce artificial semipermeable membranes, recognizing them as molecular sieves and using them in developing the first physical-chemical theory of plant cell growth. The artificial cells were created by putting droplets of glue in tannic acid; these grew under infusion of water. (Other membranes were created with tannic acid plus verdigris or potassium ferrocyanide plus copper chloride). These membranes laid the foundation for research into osmotic pressure in solutions (Wilhelm Pfeffer and Jacobus Henricus van 't Hoff used them), and Traube himself did research on the manifestations of diffusion and osmosis.

=== Pathophysiology, bacteriology and hygienics ===
Traube also made an important contribution to the study of the etiology of disease. Together with Gscheidlen, an assistant of Rudolf Heidenhain he was the first to demonstrate via animal experiments that the organism has the ability to eliminate putrefactive bacteria. In evaluating the results, he distinguished chemical poisoning from infection with microorganisms on the one hand, and pathogenic from putrefactive bacteria on the other. Further, he was the first to propose a relation between immune system to infections and active oxygen in the blood cells. In his last work Traube proposed disinfecting drinking water with calcium chloride. This technique became very important. By 1914 the method was used in more than 100 cities in America. It was reintroduced to Germany after World War II via the American occupation.

=== Biological oxidation ===
Traube developed a homogeneous concept of the critical significance of cellular respiration for the generation of heat, formation and maintenance of structures and organ function. From his point of view biological oxidation takes place not only in the blood but in all tissues. Traube's theory of muscular metabolism is significant because it showed the close relationship between respiration, muscular activity and heat generation, thus contributed to the refutation of Liebig's theory of nutrients. The substrates for creating muscle power were thus primarily nitrogen-free compounds and not just proteins. To investigate the process of enzymatic oxygen activation in organisms Traube did experimental research into inorganic autoxidation and oxygen activation. He thus demonstrated the role of water as active partner in slow oxidations and showed the intermediate character of hydrogen peroxide generation.

== Accolades and appreciations ==
In consistently applying chemistry to physiology, Traube was a follower of Liebig and peer of Hoppe-Seyler. Traube produced 51 publications, lectured and occasionally taught. His significant pupils were Guido Bodländer and his own son Wilhelm Traube. His biochemical concepts influenced later research. In his time he was especially noted for his clarification of the role of nutrients in metabolism and his work with semipermeable membranes. The University of Halle-Wittenberg conferred an honorary doctorate of medicine on Traube in 1867 and he was elected a corresponding member of the Prussian Academy of Sciences in Berlin in 1886. Louis Pasteur called Traube an excellent physiologist and professor; extensive appreciations were written by August Wilhelm von Hofmann, Hermann Emil Fischer and Ferdinand Cohn. In 1875 Charles Darwin had asked Traube to send him his work on cell formation. Philosophers, too, showed great interest in his results. In the 1870s Karl Marx met Traube in Karlsbad to learn more about inorganic cells because Friedrich Engels was working on the relation between organic and inorganic nature, i.e., the dialectics of nature in Anti-Dühring, and Traube's artificial cells served as models of living plant cells. When the young Robert Koch in 1876 presented his discovery of bacillus anthracis as the specific cause of anthrax to the leading bacteriologist Ferdinand Cohn in Breslau, Traube, who had by then achieved academic recognition, was one of the few invited to witness this momentous event.

== Bibliography ==
All of Traube's publications (with one exception :"Über den Milchzucker als Medikament") were compiled by his sons in:

- Traube, M.: Gesammelte Abhandlungen. Hrsg. H. und W. Traube, Berlin, Mayer und Müller (1899)

Some important publications:

- Über die Gesetze der Zuckerausscheidung im Diabetes mellitus. Virchow's Archiv f. Path. Anatomie Bd. 4 (1852) 109
- Zur Theorie der Gährungs- und Verwesungs-Erscheinungen, wie der Fermentwirkungen überhaupt. Poggendorff, Annal. d. Phys. u. Chem. Bd. 103 (1858) 331
- Theorie der Fermentwirkungen. Verlag Ferd. Dümmler, Berlin 1858
- Über die Beziehung der Respiration zur Muskelthätigkeit und die Bedeutung der Respiration überhaupt. Virchow's Archiv f. Path. Anatomie Bd. 21 (1861) 386
- Über die Verbrennungwärme der Nahrungsstoffe. Virchow's Archiv f. Path. Anatomie Bd. 21 (1861) 414
- Über homogene Membranen und deren Einfluß auf die Endosmose. Vorläufige Mitteilungen. Zentralblatt f. d. med. Wissenschaften Nr. 7 u. 8 (1866)
- Experimente zur Theorie der Zellenbildung und Endosmose. Reichert's u. du Bois-Reymond's Archiv (1867)
- Über Fäulnis und Widerstand der lebenden Organismen gegen dieselbe. Jahresbericht der Schles. Gesellschaft für vaterl. Cultur (1874) 179
- Über das Verhalten der Alkoholhefe in sauerstoffgasfreien Medien. Ber. d. deutschen chem. Gesellsch. 7 (1874) 872
- Zur mechanischen Theorie des Zellwachsthums und zur Geschichte dieser Lehre. Botanische Zeitung 36 (1878) Nr. 42, 43, 44
- Über den Milchzucker als Medikament. Deutsche Medizinische Wochenschrift Nr.9 (1881) 113-114
- Über Aktivierung des Sauerstoffs. Ber. d. deutschen chem. Gesellschaft 15 (1882) 659
- Über das Verhalten des nascierenden Wasserstoffs gegen Sauerstoffgas. Ber. d. deutschen chem. Gesellschaft 16 (1883) 1201
- Zur Lehre von der Autoxydation (langsamen Verbrennung reducierender Körper). Ber. d. deutschen chem. Gesellsch. 22 (1889) 1496
- Zur Geschichte der Lehre von den antiseptischen Eigenschaften der höheren Organismen. Zentralblatt für klinische Medizin (1891) Nr. 52
- Einfaches Verfahren Wasser in grossen Mengen keimfrei zu machen. Zeitschrift f. Hygiene und Infectionskrankheiten 16 (1894) 149

== Sources and literature ==
- Henrik Franke: MORITZ TRAUBE (1826-1894) - Leben und Wirken des universellen Privatgelehrten und Wegbereiters der physiologischen Chemie. Med. Dissertation 1994, Universitätsbibliothek der Humboldt-Universität Berlin Signatur 94 HB 1449.
- Henrik Franke: Moritz Traube (1826-1894) Vom Weinkaufmann zum Akademiemitglied, "Studien und Quellen zur Geschichte der Chemie", Band 9, Verlag für Wissenschafts- und Regionalgeschichte Dr. Michael Engel, ISBN 978-3-929134-21-6
- HOFMANN, A.W.: Begründung des Vorschlages von MORITZ TRAUBE zum korrespondierenden Mitglied der Akademie der Wissenschaften zu Berlin vom 10. Juni 1886 (Zentrales Archiv der Deutschen Akademie der Wissenschaften zu Berlin, Sign. II-III, 123, S. 115-117, 5 Bl.)
- TRAUBE, M.: Brief an K. G. J. WEINHOLD vom 11. Juni 1888 (Zentrales Archiv der Deutschen Akademie der Wissenschaften zu Berlin, NL-Weinhold 1419, 4 Bl.)
- TRAUBE, M.: Briefe. Staatsbibliothek zu Berlin. Preußischer Kulturbesitz. Handschriftenabt. Sign. Slg. Darmstaedter G 1 1875 (12)
- BODLÄNDER, G.: Moritz Traube. Ber. d. deutschen chem. Gesellschaft 28 (1895)
- COHN, F.: Nachruf und Nekrolog Moritz Traube. Jahresber. der Schlesischen Gesellsch. f. vaterländ. Kultur 72 (1894/1895). II. Abt., b. Sitzung d. zoolog.-botan. Section v. 1.11.1894, 63-64; Nekrologe 16-19; Allgem. Bericht 1-14
- FISCHER, E.: Dr. Moritz Traube. Ber. d. deutschen chem. Gesellschaft 27 (1894) 1795-1796
- FRAENKEL, M.: Moritz Traube. Das Lebensbild eines genialen Oberschlesiers. Oppeln (1931)
- HOPPE-SEYLER, F.: Über Gährungen. Antwort auf einen Angriff des Herrn Moritz Traube. Ber. d. deutschen chem. Gesellschaft 10 (1877) 693-695
- LIEBEN, F.: Geschichte der physiologischen Chemie. Leipzig und Wien (1935)
- MÄGDEFRAU, K.: Geschichte der Botanik. 2. Aufl., Stuttgart, Jena, New York (1992)
- MÜLLER, K.: Moritz Traube und seine Theorie der Fermente. Zürich, Univ. med. Diss. 1970
- SOURKES, TH. L.: Moritz Traube, 1826 - 1894: His contribution to biochemistry. Journal of the History of Medicine 10 (1955) 379-391
