= Christian Gottfried Ehrenberg =

German biologist (1795–1876)

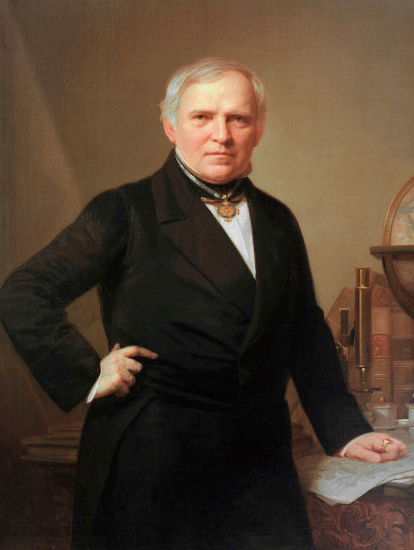
- Portrait by Eduard Radke, c. 1855
- Born: 19 April 1795; Delitzsch, Germany
- Died: 27 June 1876 (aged 81); Berlin, Germany
- Education: University of Leipzig, University of Berlin
- Known for: Symbolae physicae
- Spouses: Julie Rose, Karoline Friederike Friccius
- Children: Four surviving daughters by first wife: Helene (married Johannes von Hanstein), Mathilde (married Karl Friedrich August Rammelsberg), Laura and Clara Ehrenberg. One son by second wife: Hermann Alexander
- Parent(s): Johann Gottfried Ehrenberg and Christiane Dorothea Becker
- Awards: Wollaston Medal (1839); Leeuwenhoek Medal (1877)
- Scientific career
- Fields: Naturalist
- Workplaces: University of Berlin
- Notable students: Ferdinand Julius Cohn
- Author abbrev. (botany): Ehrenb.

Christian Gottfried Ehrenberg (19 April 1795 – 27 June 1876) was a German naturalist, zoologist, botanist, comparative anatomist, geologist, and microscopist. He was one of the most productive and renowned scientists of his time and a friend of the famous explorer Alexander von Humboldt. As a professor of medicine at the University of Berlin he was primarily interested in biology, naturalist studies and microscopy. His studies on micro-organisms led him to discover a number of protozoa, including the organisms giving the colour of the Red Sea, and he was among the first to suggest the separation of microscopic organisms into a grouping separate from the plants and animals. He wrote a major book on the life of microbes which included his own illustrations, 'Die Infusionsthierchen als vollkommene Organismen. Ein Blick in das tiefere organische Leben der Natur' ('The Microscopic Infusoria as Complete Organisms. An Examination of the Deeper Organic Life in Nature'). He was also a pioneer of micropaleontology.

== Biography ==
Christian Ehrenberg was born in Delitzsch, the son of judge Johann Gottfried Ehrenberg (1757–1826) and his wife Christiane Dorothea Becker (1769–1808). His brother Carl August Ehrenberg (1801–1849) became a botanist and plant collector. He went to Schulpforta and studied theology at Leipzig from 1815 and then shifted to the natural sciences and medicine at Berlin. He received a medical doctorate in 1818 with a dissertation on fungi Sylvae mycologicae Berolinenses. In 1818 he was made member of the Leopoldina Academy. In 1820–1825, on a scientific expedition sponsored by Heinrich von Menu von Minutoli to the Middle East with his classmate and friend Wilhelm Hemprich, he collected thousands of specimens of plants and animals. He investigated parts of Egypt, the Libyan Desert, the Nile valley and the northern coasts of the Red Sea, where he made a special study of the corals. Subsequently, parts of Syria, Arabia and Abyssinia were examined. Minutoli left the expedition when the group was blocked on the Libyan border. Hemprich and Ehrenberg continued to Alexandria and then to Cairo. Hembrich however died of Malaria on 30 June 1825. Ehrenberg managed to return to Berlin. Some results of these travels and of the important collections that had been made were reported on by Alexander von Humboldt in 1826. While in Sudan he designed the mansion of the local governor of Dongola, Abidin Bey. In 1827 he was appointed professor of medicine at Berlin University. He went on another expedition in 1829 into Russia along with others including Alexander von Humboldt and Gustav Rose, (who was the brother of Heinrich Rose). After his return, Ehrenberg published several papers on insects and corals and two volumes Symbolae physicae (1828–1834), in which many particulars of the mammals, birds, insects, etc., were made public. Other observations were communicated to scientific societies.

=== Family ===
Ehrenberg married Gustav Rose's cousin Julie Rose (1804–1848) in 1831. After their first son died in infancy they had four daughters: Helene (born 1834), Mathilde (1835–1890), Laura (born 1836) and Clara Ehrenberg (1838–1916). His youngest daughter Clara Ehrenberg was his assistant for over twelve years. She aided his scientific research, organised and indexed his collections and correspondence, and prepared a taxonomic reference book. Clara was also a published scientific illustrator. Helene married the botanist Johannes von Hanstein and Mathilde married the mineralogist Karl Friedrich August Rammelsberg. In 1852 Ehrenberg married his second wife, Karoline Friederike Friccius (1812–95), who was related to the chemist Eilhard Mitscherlich. The couple had one son, Hermann Alexander Ehrenberg.

=== Microscopic organisms ===
For nearly 30 years Ehrenberg examined samples of water, soil, sediment, blowing dust and rock and described thousands of new taxa, among them well-known flagellates such as Euglena, ciliates such as Paramecium aurelia and Paramecium caudatum, and many fossils, in nearly 400 scientific publications. He was particularly interested in a unicellular group of protists called diatoms, but he also studied, and named, many species of radiolaria, foraminifera and dinoflagellates.

This research had an important bearing on some of the infusorial earths used for polishing and other economic purposes; they added, moreover, largely to our knowledge of the microorganisms of certain geological formations, especially of the chalk, and of the marine and freshwater accumulations. Until Ehrenberg took up the study it was not known that considerable masses of rock were composed of minute forms of animals or plants. He thus became a pioneer of micropaleontology. He also demonstrated that the phosphorescence of the sea was due to organisms.

He continued until late in life to investigate the microscopic organisms of the deep sea and of various geological formations.

He died in Berlin on 27 June 1876.

== Scientific honors ==
Ehrenberg was a member of the Royal Swedish Academy of Sciences from 1836 and a foreign member of the Royal Society of London from 1837. In 1839, he won the Wollaston Medal, the highest award granted by the Geological Society of London. Ehrenberg was elected a Foreign Honorary Member of the American Academy of Arts and Sciences in 1849. He was also the first winner of the Leeuwenhoek Medal in 1877.

== Legacy ==
After his death in 1876, his collections of microscopic organisms were deposited in the Berlin's Natural History Museum (this museum was a part of the University of Berlin until it left the university in 2009). The "Ehrenberg Collection" includes 40,000 microscope preparations, 5,000 raw samples, 3,000 pencil and ink drawings, and nearly 1,000 letters of correspondence. His collection of scorpions, and other arachnids from the Middle East, is also held in the Berlin Museum. Many herbaria around the world also hold botanical collections made by Ehrenberg, including the National Herbarium of Victoria at the Royal Botanic Gardens, Melbourne, the National Museum of Natural History, France and the herbarium at the Royal Botanic Gardens, Kew.

In his hometown, Delitzsch, the highest A-Level school, the "Ehrenberg-Gymnasium" is named after him. The best student of the school year receives the Ehrenberg Prize and a scholarship.

Ehrenberg Island in the Svalbard archipelago is named after Ehrenberg.

In 1998 the Linnean Society of London dedicated a special issue to "Christian Gottfried Ehrenburg (1795–1876): The man and his legacy".

== Standard author abbreviation ==
His zoological author abbreviation is Ehrenberg.

== Publications ==
- Ehrenberg, C.G. (1828). Naturgeschichtliche Reisen durch Nord-Afrika und West-Asien in den jahren 1820 bis 1825 von Dr. W.F. Hemprich und Dr. C.G. Ehrenberg. Historischer Theil. Ernst Siegfried Mittler: Berlin, .
- Ehrenberg, C.G. (1828–1900). Symbolae physicae, Species:Christian Gottfried Ehrenberg#Symbolae physicae.
- Ehrenberg, C.G. (1830–1836). Vorträge in der Akademie der Wissenschaften zu Berlin im Jahre 1830–1836, .
  - Band 1 : Organisation, Systematik und geographisches Verhältniss der Infusionsthierchen. Berlin: gedruckt in Druckerei der Königlichen Akademie der Wissenschaften, 1830, .
    - Die geographische Verbreitung der Infusionsthierchen in Nord-Afrika und West-Asien, beobachtet auf Hemprich und Ehrenbergs Reisen, S. 1–20, .
    - Beiträge zur Kenntnis der Organisation der Infusorien und ihrer geographischen Verbreitung, besonders in Sibirien, S. 21–108, .
  - Band 2 : Zur Erkenntniss der Organisation in der Richtung des kleinsten Raumes. Berlin: gedruckt in Druckerei der Königlichen Akademie der Wissenschaften, 1832–1836, (note: incorrect name at Google Books).
    - Über die Entwickelung und Lebensdauer der Infusionsthiere, nebst ferneren Beiträgen zu einer Vergleichung ihrer organischen Systeme, 1831, S. 1–154, .
    - Dritter Beitrag zur Erkenntniss grosser Organisation in der Richtung des kleinsten Raumes, S. 145–336, .
    - Zusätze zur Erkenntniss grosser organischer Ausbildung in den kleinsten thierischen Organismen, 1835, S. 151–180, .
- Ehrenberg, C.G. (1835). Die Akalephen des rothen Meeres und der Organismus der Medusen der Ostsee. Abhandlungen der Königlichen Akademie der Wissenschaften zu Berlin. p. 181–260, with foldout between p. 260–261, .
- Ehrenberg, C.G. (1838). Die Infusionsthierchen als vollkommene Organismen. 2 vols., Leipzig, .
- Ehrenberg, C.G. (1839). Recherches sur l'organisation des animaux infusoires. J.B. Baillière: Paris, .
- Ehrenberg, C.G. (1840). Das grössere Infusorienwerke. Königliche Preussischen Akademie der Wissenschaften zu Berlin Bericht, 198–219.
- Ehrenberg, C.G. (1843). Verbreitung und Einfluss des mikroskopischen Lebens in Süd-und Nord Amerika. Königliche Akademie der Wissenschaften zu Berlin Physikalische Abhandlungen, 1841:291–446.
- Gravenhorst, J.L.C. (1844). Naturgeschichte der Infusionsthierchen nach Ehrenbergs groβem Werke über diese Thiere. Verlag und Druck von Gratz, Barth und Comp.: Breslau, .
- Ehrenberg, C.G. (1848). Uber eigenthumliche auf den Bamen des Urwaldes in SU-Amerika zahlreich lebend mikroskopische oft kieselschalige Organismen. Königliche Akademie der Wissenschaften zu Berlin Nonatsber. 213–220.
- Ehrenberg, C.G. (1854). Mikrogeologie. 2 vols., Leipzig, .
- Ehrenberg, C.G. (1875). Fortsetzung der mikrogeologischen Studien. Abhandlungen der königlichen Akademie der Wissenschaft: Berlin.
- The Ehrenberg Collection (including plates from Mikrogeologie, 1854). Available at Museum für Naturkunde, Humboldt-Universität
- See also:.

== See also ==
- Taxa named by Christian Gottfried Ehrenberg.

== Other sources ==
- Kästner, Ingrid; Wilde, Manfred (2004), "Christian Gottfried Ehrenberg (1795–1876) and the Ehrenberg collection in the museum of Schloss Delitzsch", Würzburger medizinhistorische Mitteilungen / Im Auftrage der Würzburger medizinhistorischen Gesellschaft und in Verbindung mit dem Institut für Geschichte der Medizin der Universität Würzburg, vol. 23, pp. 412–7, PMID 15633283
- Siesser, W G (1981), "Christian Gottfried Ehrenberg: Founder of micropaleontology.", Centaurus; International Magazine of the History of Science and Medicine, vol. 25, no. 3, pp. 166–88, Bibcode:1981Cent...25..166S, doi:10.1111/j.1600-0498.1981.tb00643.x, PMID 11615954
- Baker, I. D. B. (1997) "C. G. Ehrenberg and W. F. Hemprich's Travels, 1820–1825, and the Insecta of the Symbolae Physicae". Deutsche Entomologische Zeitschrift 44, (2):165–202.
- Kern, Ralf, Wissenschaftliche Instrumente in ihrer Zeit, 4 vols., Cologne: Koenig, 2010.
