= Quincke =

Quincke is a surname. Notable people with the surname include:

- Georg Hermann Quincke (1834–1924), German physicist
- Heinrich Quincke (1842–1922), German internist and surgeon
