= Artemisius =

Ancient physician in the 4th century CE

Artemisius was a physician who is quoted by the Gaulish medical writer Marcellus Empiricus in his work De medicamentis, and who must therefore have lived some time in or before the fourth century CE. Some scholars have suggested that this Artemisius is the same person as the "Artemius" mentioned later in the same book.
