= Hermann Traube =

German mineralogist (1860–1913)

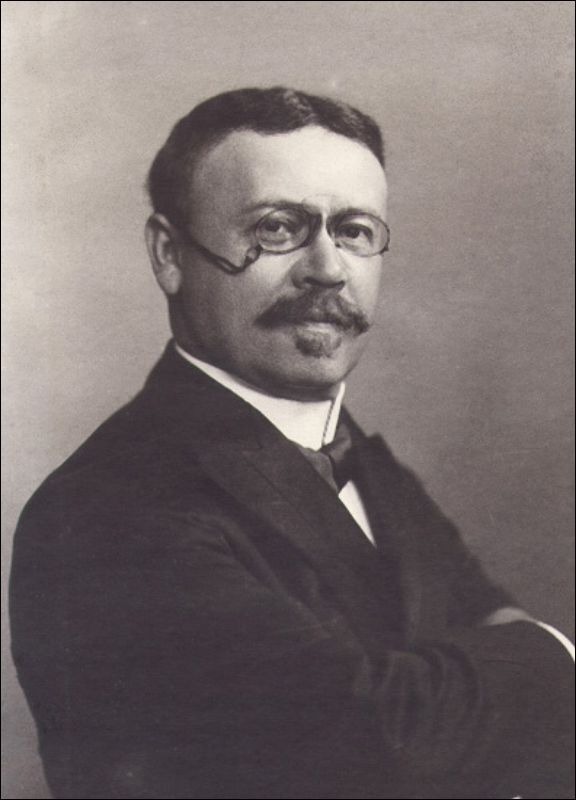

Hermann Traube (September 24, 1860 – January 29, 1913) was a German mineralogist.

== Biography ==
Born on September 23, 1860, in Ratibor, Silesia, to chemist Moritz Traube.

He studied at the Universities of Leipzig, Heidelberg, Breslau and Greifswald, earning his doctorate in 1884. At Breslau his instructors were Ferdinand Cohn and Theodor Poleck.

In 1905, he became an associate professor at the University of Berlin, and later a professor in Greifswald. He was the author of a book on Silesian minerals called Die Minerale Schlesiens (1888). Other noted works by Traube include:

- Beiträge zur Kenntniss der Gabbros, Amphibolite und Serpentine des niederschlesischen Gebirges, 1884 – To the knowledge of gabbros, amphibolites and serpentines of the Lower Silesian mountains.
- Über den Ursprung des Materials der in Europa vorkommenden verarbeiteten Nephritobjecte, 1884.
- Beiträge zur Kenntniss des Nephelins und des Davyns, 1894 – Contributions to the knowledge of nephelines and davynes.
- Über das optische Drehungsvermögen von Körpern im krystallisirten und im flüssigen Zustande, 1895 – On the optical angle of rotation of bodies in crystallized and molten states.
