= Clara Ehrenberg =

German artist, scientist and scientific illustrator (1838–1915)

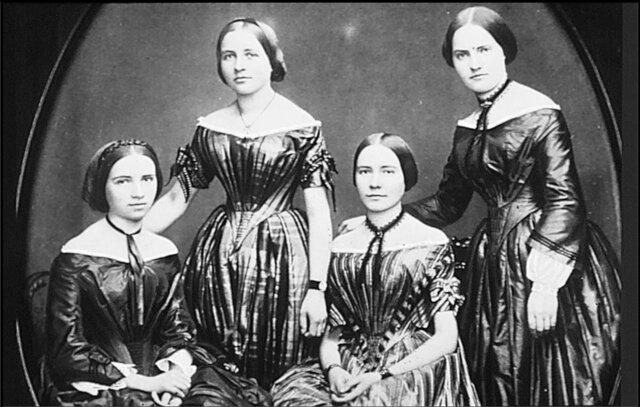
Clara Ehrenberg (standing left) with her sisters

Clara Ehrenberg (28 September 1838 – 1915) was a German micropaleontologist and scientific illustrator who worked along with her father Christian Gottfried Ehrenberg (1795–1876), illustrating many of his works and cataloguing his collections

== Biography ==
Clara Ehrenberg was born in Berlin, the youngest of four daughters of Christian Gottfried Ehrenberg and Julie née Rose (1804–1848). After the death of her mother in 1848, she was raised by her step-mother Lina Friccius (1812–1895). She was educated privately in the classics, illustration (with drawing lessons from Hermann Hanstein) and science. She trained as a teacher and received a degree in 1857. She trained in art under Julius Tempeltey, picking up techniques in botanical illustration, and watercolour techniques from Karl Eduard Biermann. They lived for some time in a building owned by the Verein der naturforschenden Freunde Berlins. Here she was sometimes involved in the scientific activities of the society. From 1860 she worked with her father on microscopy, illustration and cataloguing her father's specimen collections. From 1865 her father began to lose sight and although he regained some sight after a surgery in 1867, he was not able to use the microscope. From then, the work of observing, describing and illustrating specimens was entirely handler by her. The publications, mainly on phytoliths and foraminifers, did not explicitly note her as an author. She interacted with her father's friends in the Berlin intellectual circle including Alexander von Humboldt, Eilhard Mitscherlich, Gustav Rose, Johann Christian Poggendorff, the brothers Grimm, and others. She wrote an autobiography that was published in 1905. It was her geographically indexed specimen catalogues that made the collections of her father usable for subsequent research.
