= Duflos =

Duflos is a French surname. Notable people with this surname include:

- Adolph Ferdinand Duflos (1802–1889), French pharmacist
- Claude Duflos (1665–1727), French engraver
- Huguette Duflos (1887–1982), French actress
- Patrick Duflos (born 1965), French volleyball player

== See also ==
- Duflo
- Duflot
