= Quintus Gargilius Martialis =

Roman writer

Quintus Gargilius Martialis (fl. c. 260) was a third-century Roman writer on horticulture, botany, and medicine. He has been identified by some with the military commander of the same name, mentioned in a Latin inscription of 260 as having lost his life in the colony of Auzia in Mauretania Caesariensis. Considerable fragments of his work (probably called De hortis), which treated of the cultivation of trees and vegetables, and also of their medicinal properties, have survived, chiefly in the body of and as an appendix to the Medicina Plinii (an anonymous 4th century handbook of medical recipes based upon Pliny the Elder, Naturalis Historiae, xx–xxxii). Extant sections treat of apples, peaches, quinces, citrons, almonds, chestnuts, parsnips, and various other edibles, with an emphasis on the medical effects they have on the body (quoting Dioscorides sometimes). Gargilius also wrote a treatise on the tending of cattle (De curis boum). A biography of the emperor Alexander Severus is also attributed to him in the Augustan History. This attribution has been read as a joke by some critics.

== Editions and Translations ==
- Edited by Valentin Rose, Teubner edition, 1875, in Latin. Downloadable at Archive.org
- Gargilius Martialis: Curae boum ex corpore Gargili Martialis. Edidit Ernestus Lommatzsch, Leipzig 1903
- Q. Gargilius Martialis: De hortis. A cura di Innocenzo Mazzini, Bologna 1978 (2nd revised ed. 1988)
- Gargilius Martialis: Les remèdes tirés des légumes et des fruits. Text établi, traduit et commenté par Brigitte Maire, Paris 2002
- Gargilius Martialis: The Agricultural Fragments. Edited by James L. Zainaldin. Cambridge University Press, 2020 (Cambridge Classical Texts and Commentaries 60)
- Gargilius: Gesundheit aus dem Garten. Bilingual edition in Latin and German, by Kai Brodersen. Stuttgart: Reclam 2022, ISBN 978-3-15-014251-6
