= Wilhelm Traube =

German chemist (1866–1942)

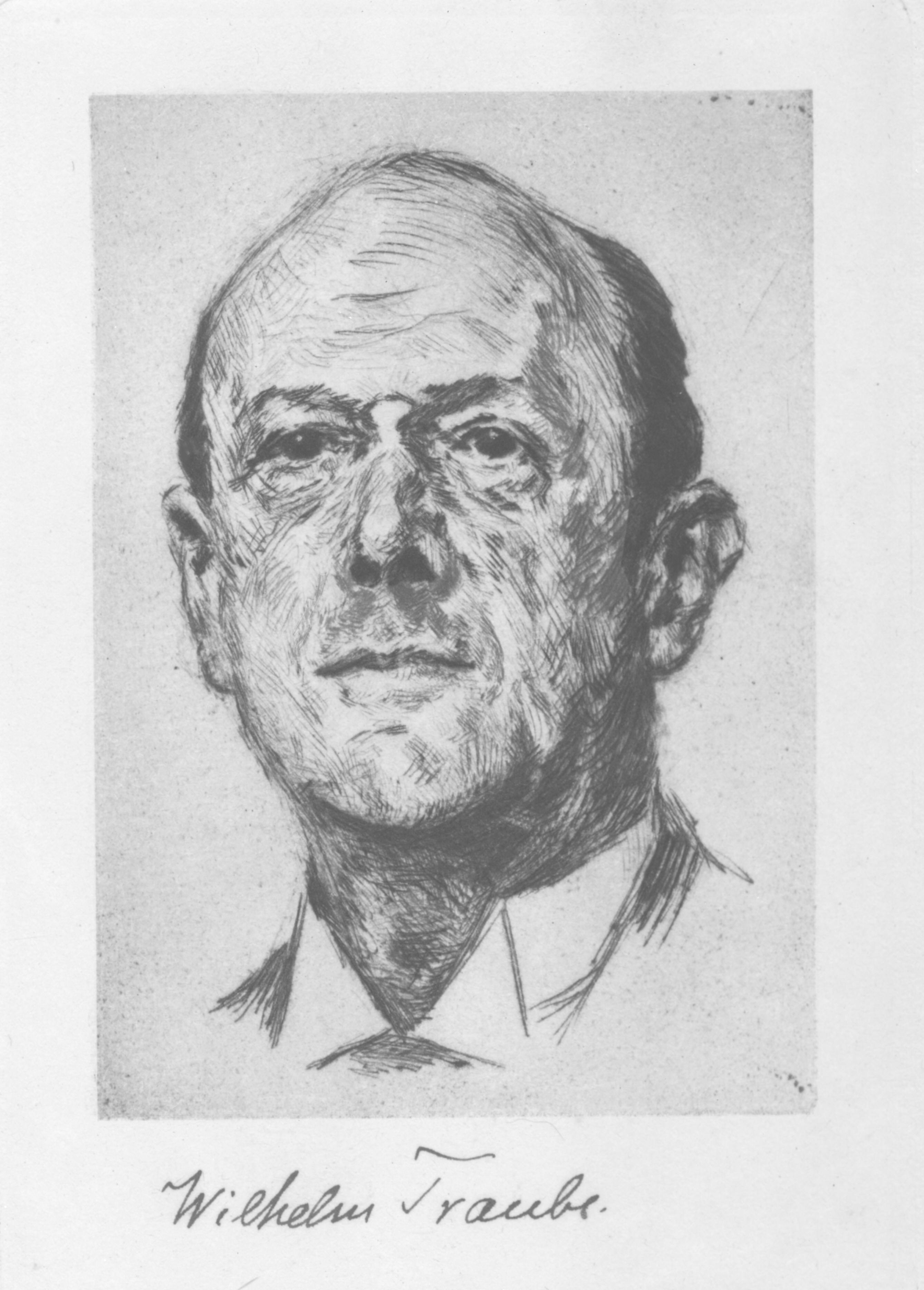
- Wilhelm Traube 1926
- Born: 10 January 1866; Ratibor (Racibórz), Prussia
- Died: 28 September 1942 (aged 76); Berlin, Germany
- Education: Ludwig-Maximilians-Universität München, Heidelberg University, Friedrich Wilhelm University of Berlin
- Known for: Traube reaction Traube purine synthesis
- Scientific career
- Fields: chemistry
- Workplaces: Friedrich Wilhelm University of Berlin
- Doctoral advisor: August Wilhelm von Hofmann, Adolf von Baeyer, Karl Friedrich Rammelsberg.

Wilhelm Traube (10 January 1866 – 28 September 1942) was a German chemist.

== Biography ==
Traube was born at Ratibor (Racibórz) in Prussian Silesia, a son of the famous private scholar Moritz Traube.

After studying law for a short time, he studied chemistry at Heidelberg University, the University of Breslau (today Wrocław), the Ludwig-Maximilians-Universität München, and the Friedrich Wilhelm University of Berlin. Among his tutors were August Wilhelm von Hofmann, Adolf von Baeyer and Karl Friedrich Rammelsberg. In 1888, he received his doctorate "Über die Additionsprodukte der Cyansäure". Since 1897, Traube was assistant at the Pharmakological Institute in Berlin, since 1902 assistant at the Pharmaceutical Institute and "Titularprofessor". In 1911, he became an associate professor and 1929 a full professor. Hermann Emil Fischer nominated Traube to be department head at the Chemical Institute (Analytical Department) of the university in Berlin. Traube was inventive and held many patents in cellulose chemistry and salts of metal complexes.

Traube is well known for a procedure of synthesis of caffeine. The TRAUBEsche Synthese (Traube purine synthesis) was important for the pharmacological industry. Kiel University appointed him full professor, but he refused. Traube was a board member of the German Chemical Society and became in 1926 a member of the Leopoldina in Halle. In December 1938, Otto Hahn used an organic salt that Traube had constructed in order to detect barium in the products of nuclear fission. Traube liked to play the piano. He was of Jewish origin but belonged to the Evangelical Church of the old-Prussian Union.

In 1935, the Nazis deprived Traube of the right to teach. His property was expropriated, and he was arrested on 11 September 1942. Traube had planned to commit suicide with cyanide before deportation, but Hahn had asked him not to do so. Hahn and Walter Schoeller had knowledge of the forthcoming deportation and tried to rescue him on the same day, but arrived a mere few hours too late. Traube died in prison in Berlin as a result of maltreatment. Traube is buried in Berlin's Weißensee Cemetery; there is no memorial stone.

== See also ==
- Osmosis

== Works ==
- Promotionsverfahren WILHELM TRAUBE (Gutachten, Lebenslauf, Dissertationsschrift, Prüfungsprotokoll, Doktorurkunde). (Archiv der Humboldt-Universität zu Berlin, Philophische Fakultät, 1888, Littr. P, Nr. 4, Vol. 46, Bl. 1-24)
- Personalakte des a.o. Prof. Dr. WILHELM TRAUBE (Archiv der Humboldt-Universität zu Berlin, Philosophische Fakultät, Band 87, Bl. 1-43)
- Personalakte des o. Prof. Dr. WILHELM TRAUBE (Archiv der Humboldt-Universität zu Berlin, Philosophische Fakultät, Band 87, Bl. 1–10)
- Henrik Franke: MORITZ TRAUBE (1826–1894) - Leben und Wirken des universellen Privatgelehrten und Wegbereiters der physiologischen Chemie. Med. Dissertation 1994, Universitätsbibliothek der Humboldt-Universität Berlin Signatur 94 HB 1449.
- Henrik Franke: Moritz Traube (1826–1894) Vom Weinkaufmann zum Akademiemitglied "Studien und Quellen zur Geschichte der Chemie" Band 9 Verlag für Wissenschafts- und Regionalgeschichte Dr. Michael Engel, ISBN 3-929134-21-7
