= Valentin Rose the Elder =

German pharmacist (1736–1771)

Valentin Rose the Elder (16 August 1736 – 28 April 1771) was a German pharmacist and chemist born in Neuruppin. He is remembered for creation of a fusible alloy known as Rose metal, which is composed of lead, bismuth and tin.

Beginning in 1761, he was owner and manager of a laboratory and pharmacy in Berlin known as Zum Weißen Schwan (At the White Swan). After his death in 1771, famed chemist Martin Heinrich Klaproth (1743–1817) became manager of the establishment.

His son, also named Valentin Rose, was a noted pharmacist. Mineralogists Heinrich Rose and Gustav Rose were his grandsons; the classicist Valentin Rose and the surgeon Edmund Rose were his great-grandsons.
