= Edmund Rose =

German surgeon (1836–1914)

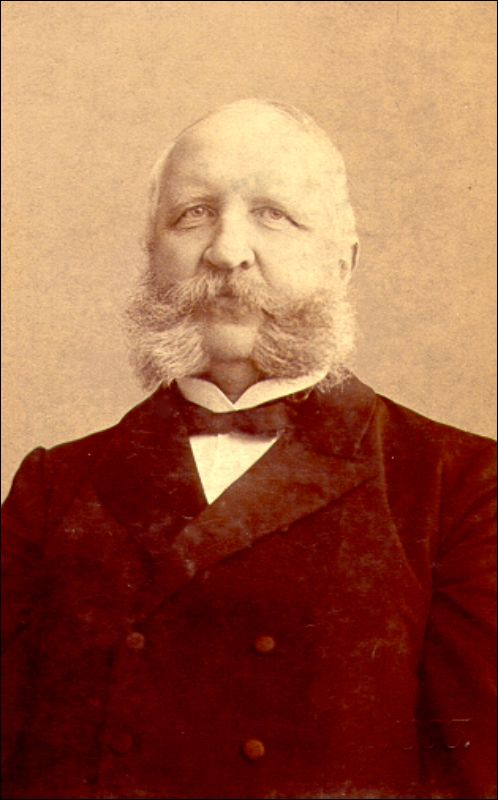
Edmund Rose (1836–1914)

Edmund Rose (October 10, 1836 – May 31, 1914) was a German surgeon who was a native of Berlin.

He studied medicine in Berlin and Würzburg, and subsequently was an assistant to surgeon Robert Ferdinand Wilms in Berlin from 1860 until 1864. From 1867 to 1881, he was a professor of surgery at the University Hospital of Zurich, and afterwards a professor at the Bethanien Hospital in Berlin (1881–1903). Among his assistants at Zurich was surgeon Rudolf Ulrich Krönlein.

Edmund Rose is remembered for his research of color blindness, xanthopsia and the drug Santonin, and how Santonin affected color vision. In surgical medicine, he performed important pathophysiological studies of cardiac tamponade (herztamponade), a term he coined in an 1884 treatise.

He was the son of mineralogist Gustav Rose (1798–1873), and a nephew to mineralogist Heinrich Rose (1795–1864). His great-grandfather was pharmacologist Valentin Rose the Elder (1736–1771), and his grandfather was Valentin Rose the Younger (1762–1807), who was also a noted pharmacologist. His elder brother was the classicist and textual critic Valentin Rose (1829–1916).

== Selected writings ==
- Herztamponade. Ein Beitrag zur Herzchirurgie.(Heart tamponade, contributions to cardiac surgery) Vogel, Leipzig 1884.
- Delirium tremens und delirium traumaticum. Enke, Stuttgart 1884.
- Über das Leben der Zähne ohne Wurzel. In: Deutsche Zeitschrift für Chirurgie, 1887.
- Der Starrkrampf beim Menschen. (Tetanus in humans) Enke, Stuttgart 1897.
