= Ernst Georg Ferdinand Küster =

German surgeon (1839–1930)

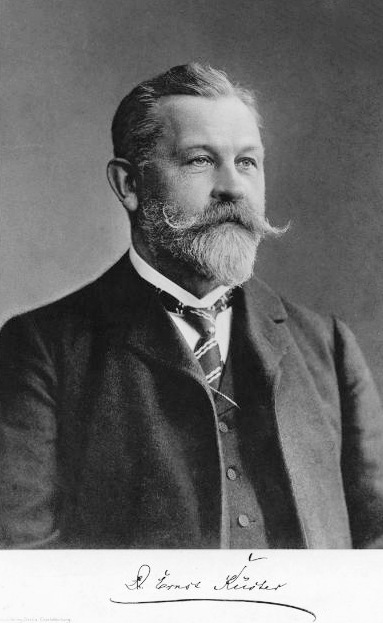
Ernst Georg Ferdinand Küster

Ernst Georg Ferdinand Küster (2 November 1839 – 19 April 1930) was a German surgeon born in Wollin.

He studied medicine in Bonn, Würzburg and Berlin, and following graduation worked as an assistant to Robert Ferdinand Wilms (1824–1880) at the Bethanien Hospital in Berlin. In 1875, he became habilitated for surgery, and from 1879 was chief physician and an associate professor at Berlin's Augusta Hospital. In 1890, he was appointed professor of surgery at the University of Marburg, later returning as a surgeon to Berlin (1907).

In 1872, Küster was a founding member of the German Society of Surgery, being chosen as its chairman in 1903.

He is credited for developing the foundation of modern radical mastoidectomy for treatment of chronic ear disease. Küster's radical mastoid operation is described as an extension of the simple mastoidectomy introduced by otologist Hermann Schwartze (1837–1910).

== Selected publications ==
- Die Chirurgie der Nieren, der Harnleiter und der Nebennieren. (Surgery of the kidney, ureter and the adrenal glands); Enke, Stuttgart 1896–1902, 2.Bd.
- Geschichte der neueren deutschen Chirurgie. (History of modern German surgery); Enke, Stuttgart 1915.
- Note: He is not to be confused with Ernst Küster (1874-1953), a professor of botany at the University of Giessen.
