= Theodor Poleck =

German chemist and pharmacist (1821–1906)

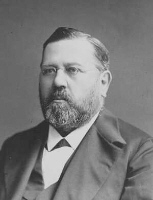
Theodor Poleck (ca. 1880)

Thomas August Theodor Poleck (November 10, 1821 – June 1, 1906) was a German chemist and pharmacist born in Neisse, Kingdom of Prussia.

He studied at Giessen in the laboratory of Justus von Liebig, and in 1846 travelled to Berlin, where he passed the state examination. Afterwards he worked in his father's pharmacy, and for several years (1853–1867), taught classes at a Realschule in Neisse. In 1867 he succeeded Adolph Ferdinand Duflos as director of the pharmaceutical institute at the University of Breslau. In 1887/88 he was dean of his faculty and in 1888/89 served as rector of the university.

His research dealt with toxicology issues, food chemistry, the study of drinking water and investigations associated with dry rot. He was a good friend of renowned chemist Moritz Traube, who sometimes worked in Poleck's laboratory.

== Selected works ==
- Beiträge zur Kenntniss der chemischen Veränderungen fliessender Gewässer, 1869.
- Chemische Analyse der Thermen von Warmbrunn am Fusse des Riesengebirges in Schlesien, 1885.
