= Alexander Sadebeck =

German geologist and mineralogist

Alexander Sadebeck (26 June 1843 in Breslau – 9 December 1879 in Hamburg) was a German geologist and mineralogist. He was a brother of botanist Richard Sadebeck (1839–1905).

He studied mineralogy and geology at the University of Berlin as a pupil of Gustav Rose. In 1865 he received his doctorate with a dissertation on Upper Jurassic formations in Pomerania. In 1872 he was appointed professor of mineralogy and geology at the University of Kiel.

In 1873 he published a new edition of Gustav Rose's Elemente der Krystallographie ("Elements of Crystallography"). He was also editor of the section on geology in Karl Klaus von der Decken's Reisen in Ost-Afrika ("Journeys in East Africa"). Furthermore, he was the author of noted works on tetrahedrite, the crystallization of galena, the crystalline forms of chalcopyrite, etc.

== Selected works ==
- Geognostische Arbeiten im Jahre 1869. In: Zeitschrift der Gesellschaft für Erdkunde zu Berlin. 5th volume. Verlag von Dietrich Reimer, Berlin 1870 – Geognostic works in 1869.
- Gustav Rose’s Elemente der Krystallographie. 3rd edition. Ernst Siegfried Mittler und Sohn, Königliche Hofbuchhandlung, Berlin 1873 – Gustav Rose's Elemente der Krystallographie.
- Rose-Sadebeck’s Elemente der Krystallographie. Volume 2. Angewandte Krystallographie. Ernst Siegfried Mittler und Sohn, Königliche Hofbuchhandlung, Berlin 1876 – Rose-Sadebeck's Elemente der Krystallographie, volume 2: Applied crystallography.
- Baron Carl Claus von der Decken’s Reisen in Ostafrika. Volume 3: Scientific results. 3rd section. therein: Geology, edited by Alexander Sadebeck. C. F. Winter’sche Verlagsbuchhandlung, Leipzig und Heidelberg 1879.

A number of his scientific articles were published in the Zeitschrift der Deutschen geologischen Gesellschaft ("Journal of the German Geological Society").
