= Rudolf Ulrich Krönlein =

Swiss surgeon (1847–1910)

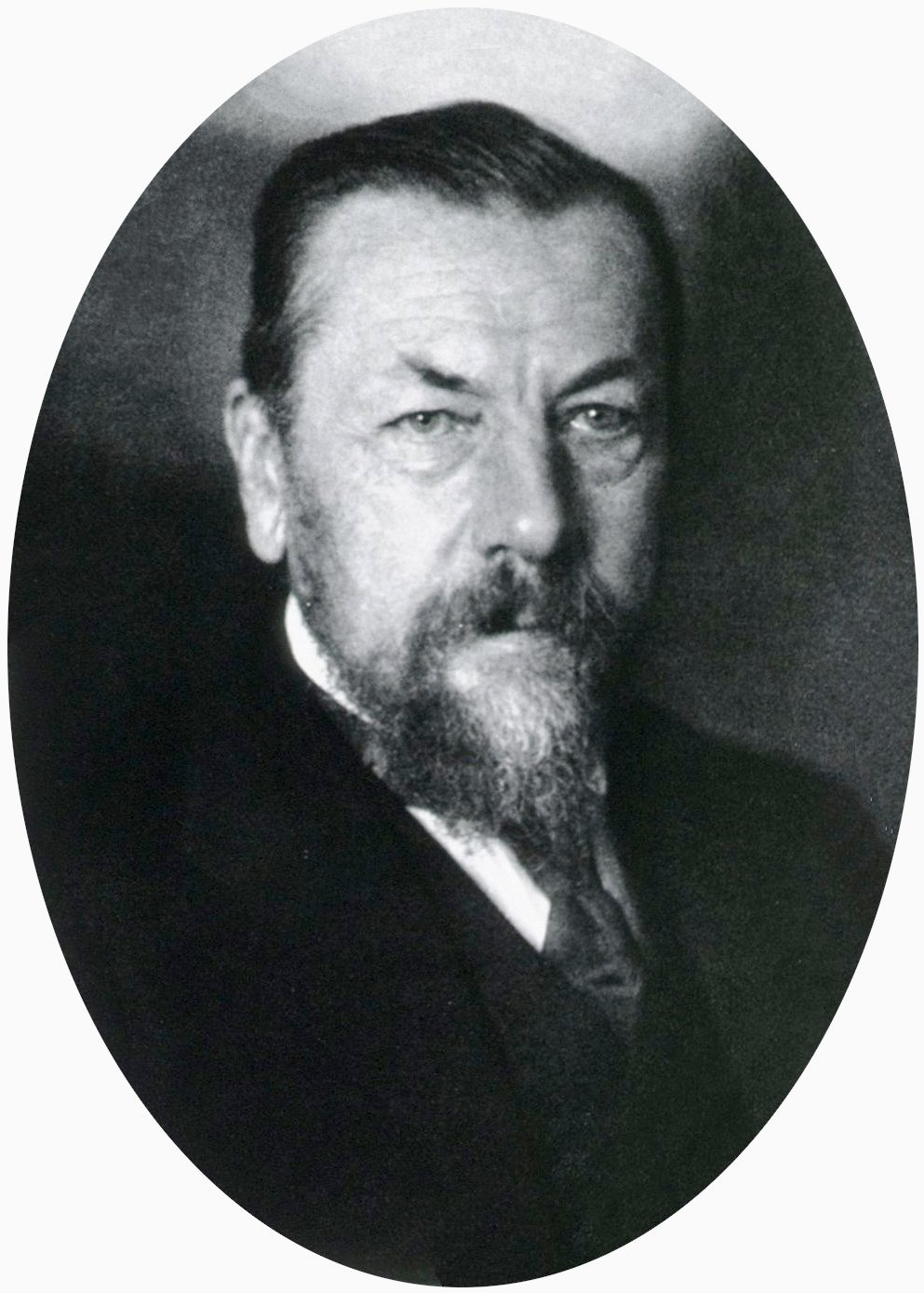
Rudolf Ulrich Krönlein.

Rudolf Ulrich Krönlein (19 February 1847 – 26 October 1910) was a Swiss surgeon who was a native of Stein am Rhein.

== Biography ==
Krönlein studied medicine at University of Zurich, where he was a student and assistant to surgeon Edmund Rose (1836–1914). In 1872, he received his medical doctorate at Zurich with a dissertation on treatment of open wounds. Later he furthered his studies in Berlin under Bernhard von Langenbeck (1810–1887), and in 1874 became director of the surgical clinic at Giessen. In 1881, he was appointed professor of surgery at the University of Zurich. After his death, he was succeeded by Ferdinand Sauerbruch (1875–1951) as chair of surgery at Zurich.

In 1886, Krönlein published an account of an 1884 appendectomy that he performed on a 17-year-old boy. Although the patient died two days after the surgery, it was the first documented case of an appendectomy. He was also a pioneer involving lung resections, and his name is associated with "Krönlein's operation", which is a lateral orbitotomy of the eye. This surgery involves removal of an orbital tumor without excision of the eye.

In 1899, he described evisceration of brain in a high velocity gunshot wound to the head.

== Associated eponym ==
- "Krönlein's hernia": A properitoneal inguinal hernia; a hernia having a double sac, one part in the inguinal canal, and the other part projecting from the deep inguinal ring in the subperitoneal tissues.
- A "Krönlein shot" is a high velocity gunshot wound to the head which has caused evisceration of brain.
