= Duflot =

Duflot (English: /duːˈfloʊ/, French: [dy.flo]) is a surname. Notable people with the surname include:

- Cécile Duflot (born 1975), French politician;
- Eugène Duflot (1885–1957), French sports shooter;
- Eugène Duflot de Mofras (1810–1884), French naturalist, botanist, and diplomat.

== See also ==
- Duflo
- Duflos
