= Cassius Felix =

Roman African medical writer

Cassius Felix (/ˈkæʃəs ˈfiːlɪks/; fl. 447), also Cassius Felix of Cirta, was a Roman African medical writer probably native of Constantina. He is known for having written in AD 447 a Latin treatise titled De Medicina - although the exact date is transmitted only in a relatively late manuscript from the 13th century.

The little we can say of the author comes from his book, that is meant to be a simple handbook for practical use in which he wants others to be able to take advantage of his experience as a physician. His work appears to draw heavily, both directly and indirectly, on Greek medical sources, as was common in the African school of medicine. The work describes various diseases from the head to the foot (a capite ad calcem). In each case, the name of the disease is first explained, then the cause, diagnosis and development are described and finally a treatment method is recommended.

A Christian by faith, he may be the person mentioned in passing in the anonymous De miraculis Sancti Stephani, a work written between 418 and 427, where a certain Felix is referred as holding the high medical dignity of archiater, or chief doctor of his community.

The work is not preserved in the original ancient manuscript, but only in various medieval copies. The oldest of these is kept in Munich and dates from the 7th or 8th century. Excerpts of the work were also made in the Middle Ages. The editio princeps of his work was first published in 1879 in a Teubner edition edited by Valentin Rose.

The name Cassius Felix is sometimes also applied to Cassius Iatrosophista, an earlier Greek medical writer (2nd or 3rd century AD) known only as the author of 84 or 85 Quaestiones Medicae et Problemata Naturalia (Ancient Greek: Ἰατρικαὶ Ἀπορίαι καὶ Προβλήματα Φυσικά).
