= Valentin Rose (classicist) =

German classicist and textual critic (1829 – 1916)

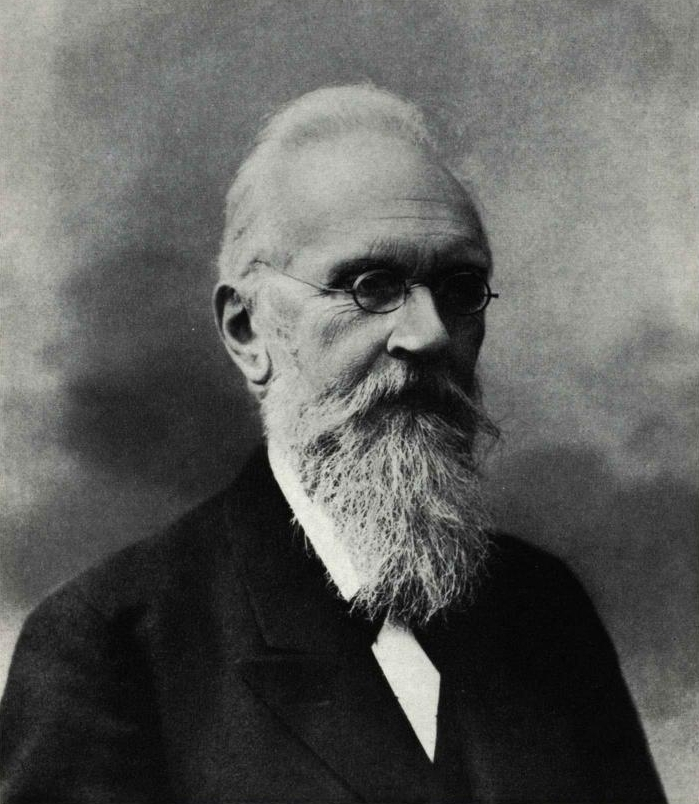
- Born: 8 January 1829; Berlin, Kingdom of Prussia
- Died: 25 December 1916 (aged 87); Berlin, Kingdom of Prussia, German Empire

Academic background
- Education: Humboldt University of Berlin

Academic work
- Discipline: Classics

Valentin Rose (8 January 1829 – 25 December 1916) was a German classicist and textual critic.

== Personal life ==
Valentin Rose was the son of mineralogist Gustav Rose (1798–1873), and a nephew to famed mineralogist Heinrich Rose (1795–1864) and to the pharmacist Wilhelm Rose (1792–1867), of whom he published a brief remembrance (Berlin 1867). His great-grandfather was pharmacologist Valentin Rose the Elder (1736–1771), and his grandfather was Valentin Rose the Younger (1762–1807), who was also a noted pharmacologist. His younger brother was the surgeon Edmund Rose. In August 1872, he married Marie Poggendorff, the daughter of Johann Christian Poggendorff.

== Academic career ==
Rose received his doctorate from the Friedrich-Wilhelms-Universität in Berlin in 1854. In 1855, he took a post at the Royal Library at Berlin, where he remained until his retirement in 1905. Under his leadership, the library's Manuscript Department (which he headed from 1886), gained a leading international reputation. He published catalogs of the collection between 1893 and 1905, and among the important discoveries made were texts in the history of medicine and in horticulture.

=== Aristotelian fragments ===
Rose's first edition of the fragments of Aristotle was Aristoteles Pseudepigraphus (1863). As the title suggests, Rose considered these all to be spurious. The third revised edition was published at Leipzig in 1886 with the title Aristotelis Qui Ferebantur Librorum Fragmenta. The engagement of Friedrich Nietzsche with this work has been described in the first chapter of James I. Porter, Nietzsche and the Philology of the Future, Stanford, 2000.

=== Other works ===
His other works (among them several editiones principes) include:

- De Aristotelis librorum ordine et auctoritate, inaugural dissertation, 1854 (online)
- Anecdota graeca et graecolatina: Mitteilungen aus Handschriften zur Geschichte der griechischen Wissenschaft, 2 vols., 1864-1870 (vols. 1–2, vol. 1, vol. 2)
- Teubner editions of Vitruvius (1867), Anacreon (1868, 1876) Medicina Plinii and Quintus Gargilius Martialis (1875), Anthimus (1877), Cassius Felix (1879), Soranus and Muscio (1882), Theodorus Priscianus (1894), Gilles de Corbeil (1907)
