= Guido Bodländer =

German chemist (1855–1904)

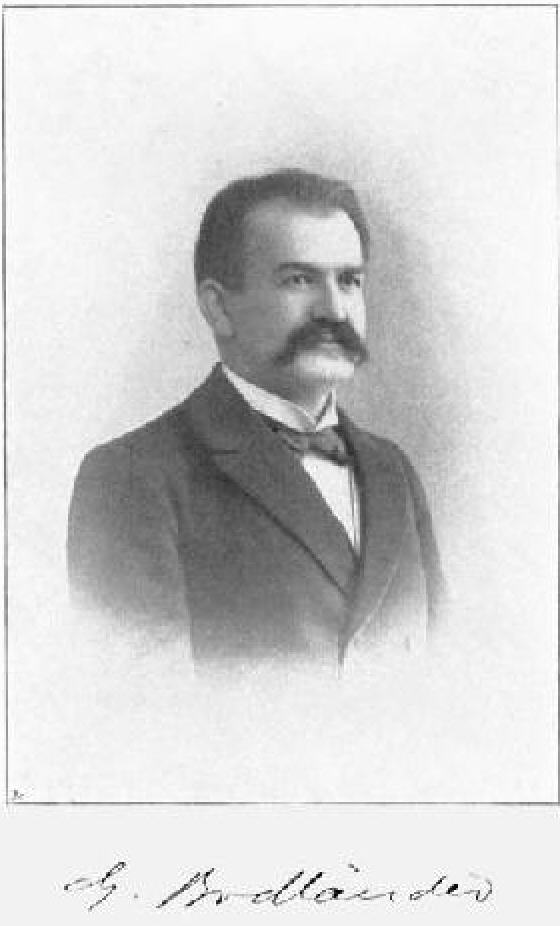
- Born: 31 July 1855; Breslau, Germany
- Died: 25 December 1904 (aged 49); Braunschweig, Germany
- Scientific career
- Fields: organic chemistry

Guido Bodländer (31 July 1855 – 25 December 1904) was a German chemist.

After graduating from the University of Breslau in 1882, he became an assistant to Moritz Traube (1826–1894) in his laboratory at Breslau. Afterwards, he served as a pharmacology assistant in Bonn (1883–86) and later worked at the mineralogical institute in Clausthal (1887–1899). From 1897 to 1899 he worked at the institute of physical chemistry in Göttingen, and in 1899 became a professor of chemistry in Braunschweig. He was in line to succeed Walther Nernst (1864–1941) as chair of physical chemistry at the University of Göttingen, however Bodländer died at the age of 49 prior to attaining the position.

With Richard Abegg (1869–1910), he introduced a theory of "electo-affinity". Also, he is credited with the invention of a Gasgravimeter (gas gravimeter).

== Selected writings ==
- Lehrbuch der Anorganischen Chemie für Studierende und Selbstunterricht, 1896 – Textbook of inorganic chemistry for students and self-study.
- Ueber langsame Verbrennung, 1899 – About slow combustion.
- "Electro-affinity as a basis for the systematization of inorganic compounds", 1902; with Richard Abegg (reprinted from the American Chemical Journal. Vol. 28, Nr. 3).
- Berichte über einzelne gebiete der angewandten physikalischen chemie, 1904 – Reports on individual areas of applied physical chemistry.

== Bibliography ==
- POGGENDORFF, J. C.: Biographisch-literarisches Handwörterbuch zur Geschichte der exakten Wissenschaften. Bd. 4 (1904) 141
- TRÖGER, J.: Guido Bodländer. Naturw. Rundschau 20 (1905) 78–79
- NERNST, W.: Bodländers Wirken, Zeitschrift für Elektrochemie 11 (1905) 157–161
- Alfred Coehn (1905). "Guido Bodländer". Berichte der deutschen chemischen Gesellschaft. 38 (4): 4263–4290. doi:10.1002/cber.190503804111.
