= Anthimus (physician) =

6th century Byzantine Greek physician

- Born: c. 475 CE; Constantinople? (modern-day Istanbul, Turkey)
- Died: c. 525 CE
- Occupation: Physician

Anthimus (Greek: Ἄνθιμος; fl. 511–534) was a Byzantine Greek physician at the court of the Ostrogoth king Theodoric the Great and that of the Frankish king Theuderic I, noted for his authorship of On the Observance of Foods (De observatione ciborum), a valuable source for Late Latin linguistics as well as Byzantine dietetics.

Though not a true recipe book, the text includes detailed instructions for making at least one Byzantine specialty (afrutum), using whipped egg whites, and a beef stew using honey, vinegar and spices. Preparations are described in more cursory terms for a number of other foods. Most of the preparations reflect Roman methods (using ingredients such as oxymel and oenomel), but the Frankish love of raw bacon is also cited. The author also specifically references whether specific foods were then available in Theodoric's region (near Metz in Northeastern France). Among other ingredients, the mention of several spices makes it clear that these were available in France long after the fall of Rome and centuries before the Crusades.

As a dietetic, the text also addresses the use of foods for selected ailments such as dysentery, diarrhea, dropsy, and fever. In general, Anthimus' approach is based on humoral theory (referring for instance to "melancholic humours") though he only cites unnamed "authors" and "authorities" as his sources.

== Editions ==
- Anecdota graeca et graecolatina. Mitteilungen aus Handschriften zur Geschichte der griechischen Wissenschaft, ed. by Valentin Rose, vol. 2, Ferdinand Duemmler's Verlagsbuchhandlung, Berlin 1870, p. 41 ff.
- Anthimi (1877). Rose, Valentin (ed.). Anthimi De observatione ciborum epistula ad Theudericum, regem Francorum (in Latin). Leipzig: Benedictus Gotthelf Teubner. LCCN 34013844. OCLC 882735061. OL 16829336M. Wikidata Q130283165.

== English translations ==
- Anthimus: On the Observance of Foods, translated by Mark Grant, Prospect Books, London 1996 (ISBN 1-903018-52-8)
- Anthimus (2007). Grant, Mark (ed.). On the Observance of Foods. Translated by Grant, Mark. Blackawton: Prospect Books. ISBN 978-1-903018-52-1. OCLC 1277399684. OL 12264830M. Wikidata Q130296818.
- Anthimus: How To Cook an Early French Peacock: De Observatione Ciborum – Roman Food for a Frankish King, translated by Jim Chevallier, Chez Jim Books, 2012 (online presentation).
