= Medicina Plinii =

The Medicina Plinii or Medical Pliny is an anonymous Latin compilation of medical remedies dating to the early 4th century AD.

== Content ==
The excerptor, saying that he speaks from experience, offers the work as a compact resource for travelers in dealing with hucksters who sell worthless drugs at exorbitant prices or with know-nothings only interested in profit. The material is presented in three books in the conventional order a capite ad calcem (“from head to toe,” in the equivalent English expression), the first dealing with treatments pertaining to the head and throat, the second the torso and lower extremities, and the third systemic ailments, skin diseases, and poisons.

The book contains more than 1,100 pharmacological recipes, the vast majority of them from the Historia naturalis of Pliny the Elder. Other sources include Celsus, Scribonius Largus, and Dioscorides. Most of the recipes contain a limited number of ingredients, and in contrast to more expansive and thorough collections such as the De medicamentis liber of Marcellus Empiricus, precise measurements in drachmae, denarii or other units are specified for only a few formulations.

Perhaps because Pliny's name was attached to it, the book enjoyed great popularity and influence, with many manuscript versions from the Middle Ages. It was often used as a handbook in monastic infirmaries.

The collection is also referred to as Medicina Plinii Secundi or Plinii valeriani, and its authorship is sometimes noted as “Pseudo-Pliny.” It was a major source for the Physica Plinii, a 5th- or 6th-century medical compilation.

== Sample remedies ==
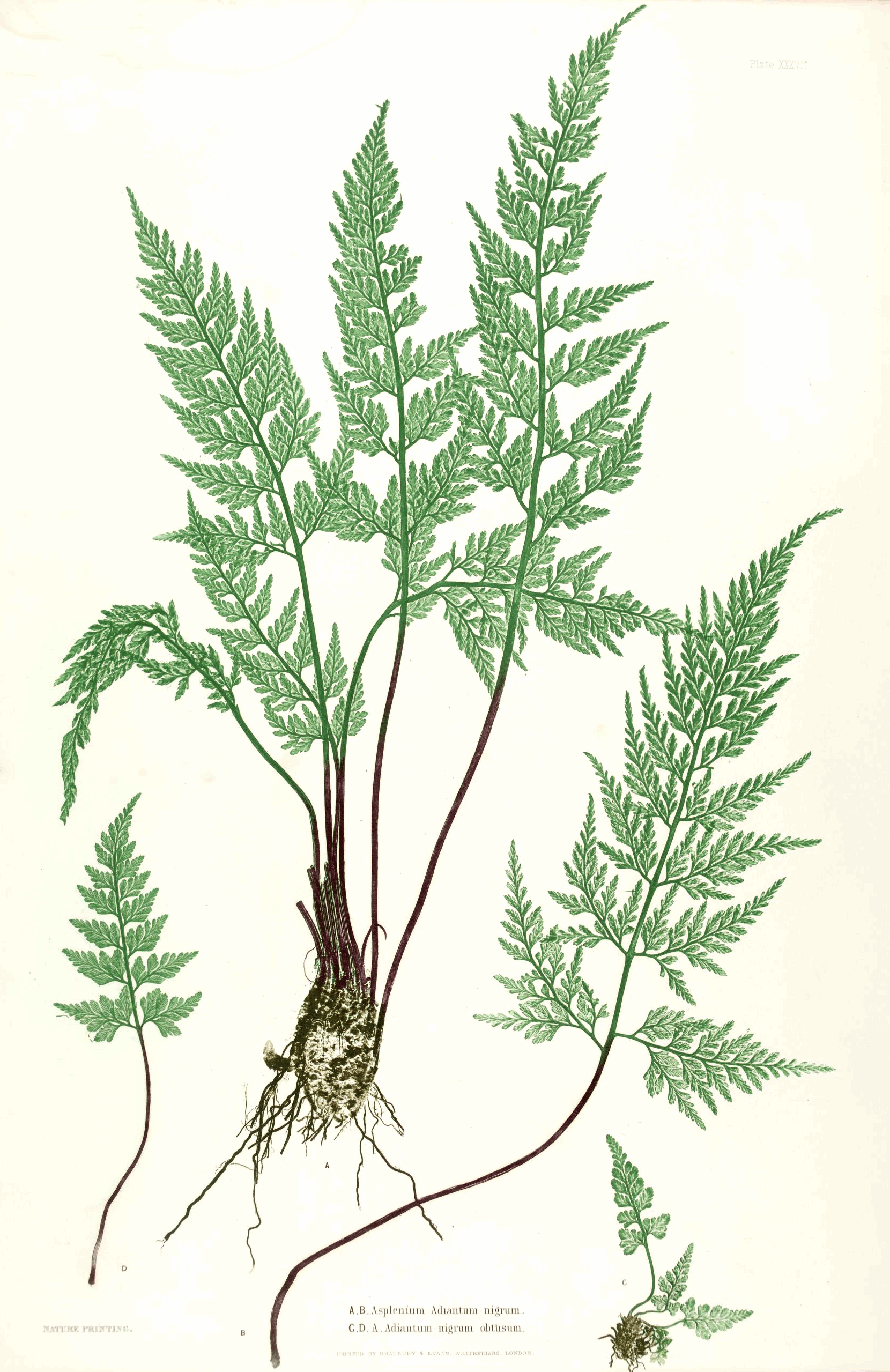
Black spleenwort, possibly the asplenium used in a remedy for bloodshot eyes

The ingredients and methods in the Medicina Plinii are typical of Latin pharmacological handbooks. Materials may be botanical, animal-derived, or metallic; processes include decoction, emulsification, calcination and fermentation. Preparations may be applied topically, or consumed. Magic, perhaps to be compared with faith healing, was a regular feature of the manuals.

Following is a prescription for bloodshot eyes:

Use the blood of a dove or pigeon or partridge or turtledove as drops. Apply a decoction of spleenwort in honey and a wool bandage soaked with oil or wine. An application of rue root also makes it better.

Several treatments are listed for quartan fever (quartanis, probably malaria). The first requires a nail that was used in a crucifixion, which is to be bound to the head with a strip of cloth, or a rope from a cross, then sprinkled with calcined cow manure. In the eight sentences of remedies — involving, among other substances, dill seed, hare's heart, a boy's urine, and a frog boiled in oil, not to mention the capture, ear-clipping, and release of a live mouse — the absence of syntactical transitions makes it less clear than in the work of Marcellus whether a sequence of treatment is meant or a series of alternatives offered. The chapter concludes with a charm and careful instructions to the practitioner:

You write the following on a virgin sheet of papyrus, which the patient is to wear fastened on his right wrist: 'Back off from this person Gaius Seius, Fever, Solomon pursues you.' In the same manner, bind bread and salt in linen suspended from a string and tie around a tree with a string and adjure the bread and salt three times: 'My guests are to arrive tomorrow, watch out for them.' He is to say this three times.

The sympathetic magic employed here (tree = person) is similar to arboreal healing charms in Cato the Elder and Marcellus. The name "Gaius Seius" (or "Gaius Lucius") was the Latin equivalent of John Doe; the patient's name was to be substituted. Magico-medical spells and inscriptions, as on amulets, frequently personify and apostrophize the ailment (here, "Fever"). The reference to Solomon is a perhaps unexpected but not unusual reminder of the syncretistic, international character of Hellenistic magic; Solomon is frequently invoked in healing charms or depicted on amulets as driving away or defeating an affliction.

== Editions ==
- Rose, Valentin. Plinii secundi quae fertur una cum Gargili Martialis Medicina. Leipzig: Teubner, 1875 (online)
- Önnerfors, Alf. Plinii secundi iunioris qui feruntur de medicina libri tres. Corpus Medicorum Latinorum 3. Berlin 1964
- Brodersen, Kai: Plinius' Kleine Reiseapotheke (Medicina Plinii, Latin and German). Stuttgart: Franz-Steiner-Verlag, 2015. ISBN 978-3-515-11026-6
- Hunt, Yvette: The Medicina Plinii: Latin Text, Translation, and Commentary. London: Routledge, 2020. ISBN 9781032177038

== See also ==
- Ancient Greek medicine
- Medicine in ancient Rome
- Medieval medicine of Western Europe
- Scribonius Largus
- Marcellus Empiricus
