= Duflo =

Duflo is a French surname. Notable people with the surname include:

- Esther Duflo (born 1972), French-American economist
- Marie Duflo (1940–2019), French mathematician
- Michel Duflo (born 1943), French mathematician

== See also ==
- Duflo isomorphism
- Duflos
- Duflot
