= Hermann Wilhelm Vogel =

German photochemist and university lecturer (1834–1898)

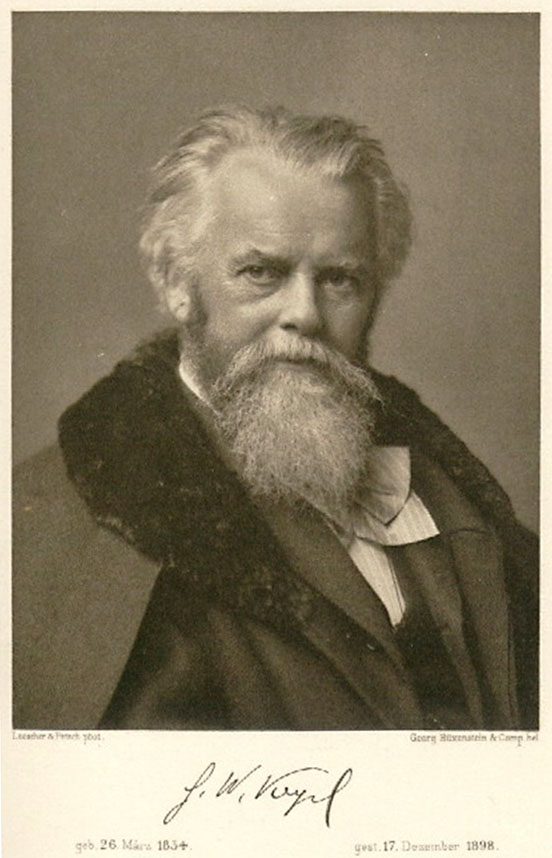
- Hermann Wilhelm Vogel, with signature in partial Kurrent handwriting script
- Born: 26 March 1834; Dobrilugk, Kingdom of Prussia
- Died: 17 December 1898 (aged 64); Berlin, German Empire
- Education: University of Berlin
- Scientific career
- Fields: Photochemistry, photography
- Workplaces: Technische Universität Berlin
- Doctoral advisor: Karl Friedrich August Rammelsberg
- Doctoral students: Alfred Stieglitz

Hermann Wilhelm Vogel (26 March 1834 – 17 December 1898) was a German photochemist and photographer who discovered dye sensitization, which is of great importance to photography.

== Academic career ==
After finishing school in Frankfurt (Oder), he studied at the Royal Industrial Institute of Berlin, earning his Ph.D. with Karl Friedrich August Rammelsberg in 1863. Vogel's thesis, which was published in Poggendorffs Annalen, had the title: Über das Verhalten des Chlorsilbers, Bromsilbers und Iodsilbers im Licht und die Theorie der Photographie (Reactions of Silver Chloride, Silver Bromide and Silver Iodide with Light and the Theory of Photography). This marked the beginning of his research into the photographic process.

From 1860 until 1865, he was an assistant in the mineralogical museum of the University of Berlin. From 1864 he was a professor at the Technische Hochschule in Charlottenburg (today Technische Universität Berlin), where he introduced photography as a field of study. From 1884, he was director of the photo-technical laboratory of TH Charlottenburg.

== Dye sensitization ==
In 1873 Vogel discovered dye sensitization, a pivotal contribution to the progress of photography. The photographic emulsions in use at that time were sensitive to blue, violet and ultraviolet light, but only slightly sensitive to green and practically insensitive to the rest of the spectrum. While trying out some factory-made collodion bromide dry plates from England, Vogel was amazed to find that they were more sensitive to green than to blue. He sought the cause and his experiments indicated that this sensitivity was due to a yellow substance in the emulsion, apparently included as an anti-halation agent. Rinsing it out with alcohol removed the unusual sensitivity to green. He then tried adding small amounts of various aniline dyes to freshly prepared emulsions and found several dyes which added sensitivity to various parts of the spectrum, closely corresponding to wavelengths of light the dyes absorbed. Vogel was able to add sensitivity to green, yellow, orange and even red.

This made photography much more useful to science, allowed a more satisfactory rendering of colored subjects into black-and-white, and brought actual color photography into the realm of the practical.

In the early 1890s, Vogel's son Ernst assisted German-American photographer William Kurtz in applying dye sensitization and three-color photography to halftone printing, so that full-color prints could be economically mass-produced with a printing press.

== Other activities ==
In addition to his work as a photographic technical innovator, Vogel taught Alfred Stieglitz between 1882 and 1886. He participated in at least two photographic expeditions to Egypt as well as others to Italy and possibly Asia. Vogel founded the periodical Photographische Mittheilungen in 1864 and served as its publisher until his death.

His silver tester, photometer for pigment printing and heliotype printing, and universal spectroscope were introduced into general use. He visited the United States in 1870 and 1883.

== Publications ==
- Lehrbuch der Photographie (Third edition, Berlin 1878)
- Praktische Spektralanalyse irdischer Stoffe (Second edition, Berlin 1888)
- Die chemischen Wirkungen des Lichts und die Photographie (Second edition, Leipzig 1883)
- Die Photographie farbiger Gegenstände in den richtigen Tonverhältnissen (Berlin 1885)
- Vom Indischen Ozean bis zum Goldland Reisebeobachtungen (Berlin 1878)
- Lichtbilder nach der Natur (Berlin 1879)
- The Chemistry of Light and Photography, in Their Application to Art, Science, and Industry (New and thoroughly revised edition, D. Appleton, New York 1889)
- Über das Spiritistentreiben (Berlin 1880)
