= Richard Sadebeck =

German pteridologist and mycologist

Richard Emil Benjamin Sadebeck (20 May 1839 in Breslau – 11 February 1905 in Meran) was a German pteridologist and mycologist. He was an older brother of mineralogist Alexander Sadebeck (1843–1879).

He studied natural sciences at the University of Breslau as a pupil of Heinrich Göppert. From 1865 to 1876 he worked as a schoolteacher in Berlin, and afterwards relocated to Hamburg, where he taught classes at the Johanneum. From 1883 to 1901 he was director of the Hamburg Botanical Museum.

In 1893 he described the fungal genus Magnusiella (syn. Taphrina).

== Selected works ==
- De Montium Inter Vistritium et Nissam Fluvios Sitorum Flora, 1864.
- Die Entwicklung des Keimes der Schachtelhalme, 1878 – Development of horsetail shoots.
- Kritische Untersuchungen über die durch Taphrina-Arten hervorgebrachten Baumkrankheiten, 1890 – Critical studies on tree diseases caused by Taphrina species.
- Die parasitischen Exoasceen : eine Monographie, 1893 – Parasitic Exoasceae.
- Filices Camerunianae Dinklageanae, 1896.
- Hydropteridineae, 1897.
- Die wichtigeren Nutzpflanzen und deren Erzeugnisse aus den deutschen Colonien, 1897 – The more important crops and their products from the German colonies.
- Die Kulturgewachse der deutschen Kolonien und ihre Erzeugnisse (1899, chapter 10 by Ernest Friedrich Gilg).
