= Robert Friedrich Wilms =

German surgeon (1824–1880)

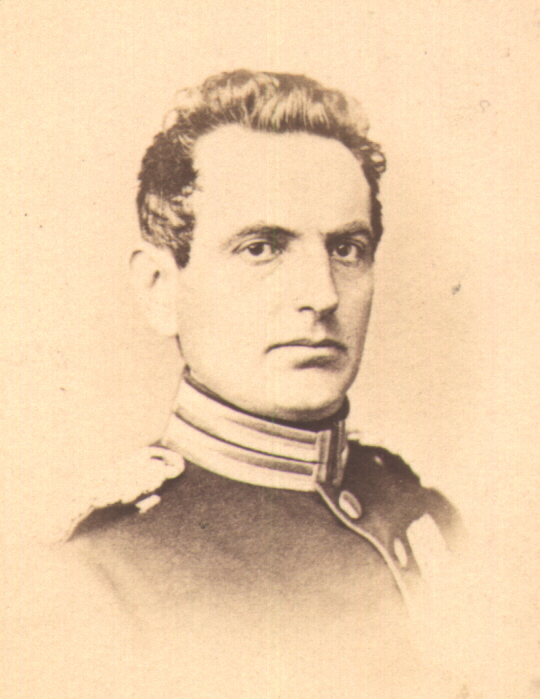
Robert Friedrich Wilms (1824–1880)

Robert Friedrich Wilms (9 September 1824 – 23 September 1880) was a German surgeon.

== Biography ==
Wilms was born in Arnswalde (today Choszczno in Poland). He studied medicine in Berlin, and in 1848 became an assistant at the Bethanien Hospital in Berlin. In 1852, he was named an ordinirenden physician and from 1862 onward, he served as Chefarzt (chief physician) at Bethanien Hospital. Wilms was a catalyst in establishing Bethanien Hospital as a center of learning for students and young surgical assistants. Among of his better known assistants in Berlin were Edmund Rose (1836–1914, Heinrich Irenaeus Quincke (1842–1922), Ernst Georg Ferdinand Küster (1839–1930) and Werner Körte (1853–1937). During the Austro-Prussian and Franco-Prussian Wars, Wilms distinguished himself in his role as consultant Generalarzt (surgeon-general).

Wilms is credited for reintroducing tracheal surgery for problems caused by diphtheria and for his work with operations that included urethrotomy (surgery of the urethra). While still a student, he was part of an expedition headed by Johannes Peter Müller (1801–1858) to Helgoland, where he researched chaetognaths, which were the topic of his thesis, "Observationes de Sagitta mare germanicum circa Helgoland".
