= Karl Friedrich August Rammelsberg =

German mineralogist (1813–1899)

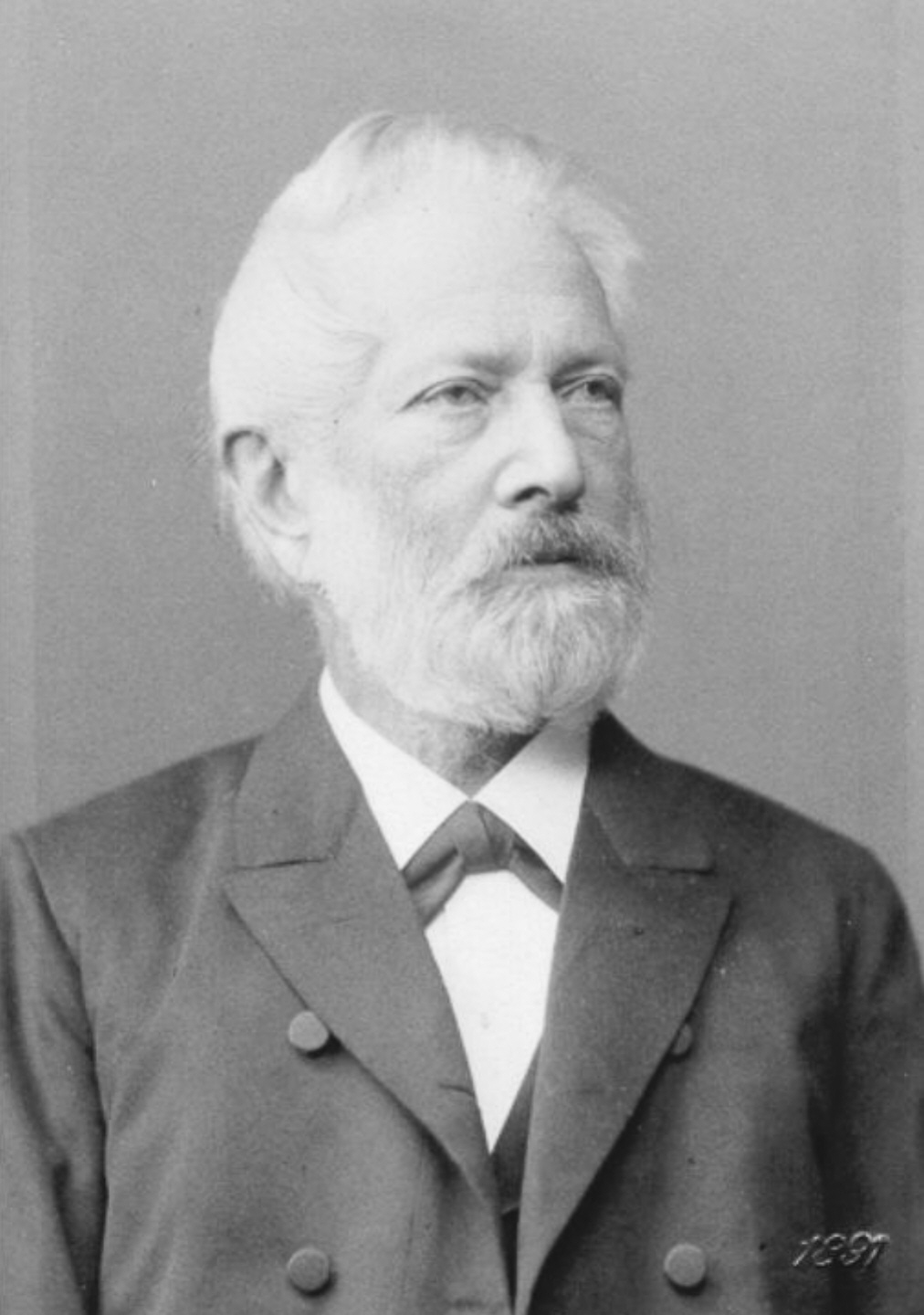
- Born: 1 April 1813; Berlin, Kingdom of Prussia
- Died: 28 December 1899 (aged 86); Groß-Lichterfelde near Berlin, German Empire
- Education: University of Berlin
- Scientific career
- Fields: Inorganic chemistry
- Workplaces: University of Berlin
- Doctoral advisor: Gustav Rose
- Doctoral students: Hermann W. Vogel

Karl Friedrich August Rammelsberg (1 April 1813 – 28 December 1899) was a German mineralogist from Berlin, Prussia.

== Life ==
After an apprenticeship in pharmacy, he studied chemistry and crystallography at the University of Berlin, where his influences were Eilhard Mitscherlich, Heinrich Rose, Christian Samuel Weiss and Gustav Rose. His graduate thesis in 1837 dealt with cyanogen, "De cyanogenii connubiis nonnullis". In 1841 he became a privatdozent at the university, and in 1845 was named an associate professor of inorganic chemistry. From 1850 he taught classes at the Gewerbeakademie, a vocational training academy that was a predecessor of Technische Universität Berlin. In 1874 he became a full professor of chemistry at the University of Berlin and in 1883 was appointed director of the inorganic chemistry laboratory.

He distinguished himself with research in the fields of mineralogy, crystallography, analytical chemistry and metallurgy. He discovered the reducing action of hypophosphoric and phosphoric acids, and was the first scientist to determine the composition of Schlippe's salt (sodium thioantimonate). In addition, he made significant contributions in research involving isomorphism. He was the first scientist other than Mendeleyev himself to include his periodic table in a textbook, namely the third edition of his Grundriss der Chemie gemäss den neueren Ansichten, published in Berlin in 1872 (although 1873 is stated on the title page).

He described the minerals, magnesioferrite and tachyhydrite. Rammelsbergite, a nickel arsenide mineral, is named after him. He died at Gross Lichterfelde, southwest of Berlin

== Published works ==
Rammelsberg was the author of a series of important textbooks, such as:

- Handwörterbuch des chemischen Teils der Mineralogie (2 volumes, 1841; supplement 1843–53).
- Lehrbuch der chemischen Metallurgie (1850).
- Handbuch der Krystallographischen Chemie (1855).
- Handbuch der Mineralchemie (1860).
- Handbuch der Krystallographisch-physikalischen Chemie (2 volumes, 1881–82), some of the earlier works being incorporated in later and more comprehensive volumes with different titles.

He is also credited with providing translations of technical publications that were written in Italian, French and Swedish.
