= Valentin Rose (pharmacologist) =

German pharmacologist (1762–1807)

Valentin Rose the Younger (30 October 1762 – 9 August 1807) was a German pharmacologist from Berlin, Margraviate of Brandenburg. He was the son of Valentin Rose the Elder (1736–1771).

Beginning in 1778, he spent four years as a pharmacy apprentice in Frankfurt am Main, afterwards returning to Berlin, where he worked as an assistant at his late father's pharmacy. In Berlin, he attended lectures given by Johann Gottlieb Gleditsch and Martin Klaproth at the Collegium Medico-chirurgicum. In 1785, he became provisor of his father's pharmacy, of which he gained ownership of in 1791.

He is credited with the discoveries of sodium bicarbonate (1801) and inulin (1807, from elecampane root). He also developed a method for the detection of arsenic to be used in criminal investigations. With Adolf Ferdinand Gehlen, he was an editor of the Berlinisches Jahrbuch für die Pharmacie und für die damit verhundenen Wissenschaften.

== Children ==
He had two children who were both famous scientists: Heinrich Rose (1795–1864) and Gustav Rose (1798–1873). The classicist Valentin Rose and the surgeon Edmund Rose were Gustav Rose's children.
