= Scribonius Largus =

1st century AD Roman physician to the Roman emperor Claudius and author

Scribonius Largus Designatianus
- Born: c. 1
- Died: c. 50 (aged c. 49)
- Occupation: Court physician to Claudius
- Known for: Author of Compositiones
- Notable work: Compositiones

Scribonius Largus Designatianus (c. 1 – c. 50) was the court physician to the Roman emperor Claudius.

Around 47 AD, at the request of Gaius Julius Callistus, the emperor's freedman, he drew up a list of 271 prescriptions (Compositiones), most of them his own, although he acknowledged his indebtedness to his tutors, to friends, and to the writings of eminent physicians. Certain traditional remedies are also included. The work has no pretensions to style, and contains many colloquialisms, and has been cited by Peter Suber as a forerunner of Open Access. The greater part of it was transferred without acknowledgment to the work of Marcellus Empiricus (c. 410), De Medicamentis Empiricis, Physicis, et Rationabilibus, which is of great value for the correction of the text of Largus.

See the edition of the Compositiones by S. Sconocchia (Teubner 1983), which replaced the well-outdated edition of G. Helmreich (Teubner 1887).

Compositiones makes the earliest known allusion to the Hippocratic oath.

Largus is credited with an early description of peripheral nerve stimulation in the form of shocks from electric fish to provide relief from gout and headaches.

Largus was among the first Romans who wrote detailed instructions on opium (dried poppy juice) and its prescription for cold, dental pain, injuries, wounds, earaches, and colic, and described treatment for opium poisoning.

There is an obscure Latin inscription that mentions a "Lucius Scribonius Asclepiades" that Rhodius believed to indicate this Scribonius, but most scholars consider this very doubtful.

== Works ==
- De compositione medicamentorum liber. Cratandrus, Basileae 1529 Digital edition by the University and State Library Düsseldorf
- Kai Brodersen: Scribonius Largus, Der gute Arzt / Compositiones. Latin and German. Marix, Wiesbaden 2016. ISBN 978-3-7374-1017-5
- Scribonius Largus and Joelle Jouanna Bouchet (ed.) Compositions médicales (Collection des universités de France. Série latine; 412). Paris : Les Belles lettres, 2016, cop. 2016. ISBN 9782251014722.
