= Heinrich Quincke =

German physician (1842–1922)

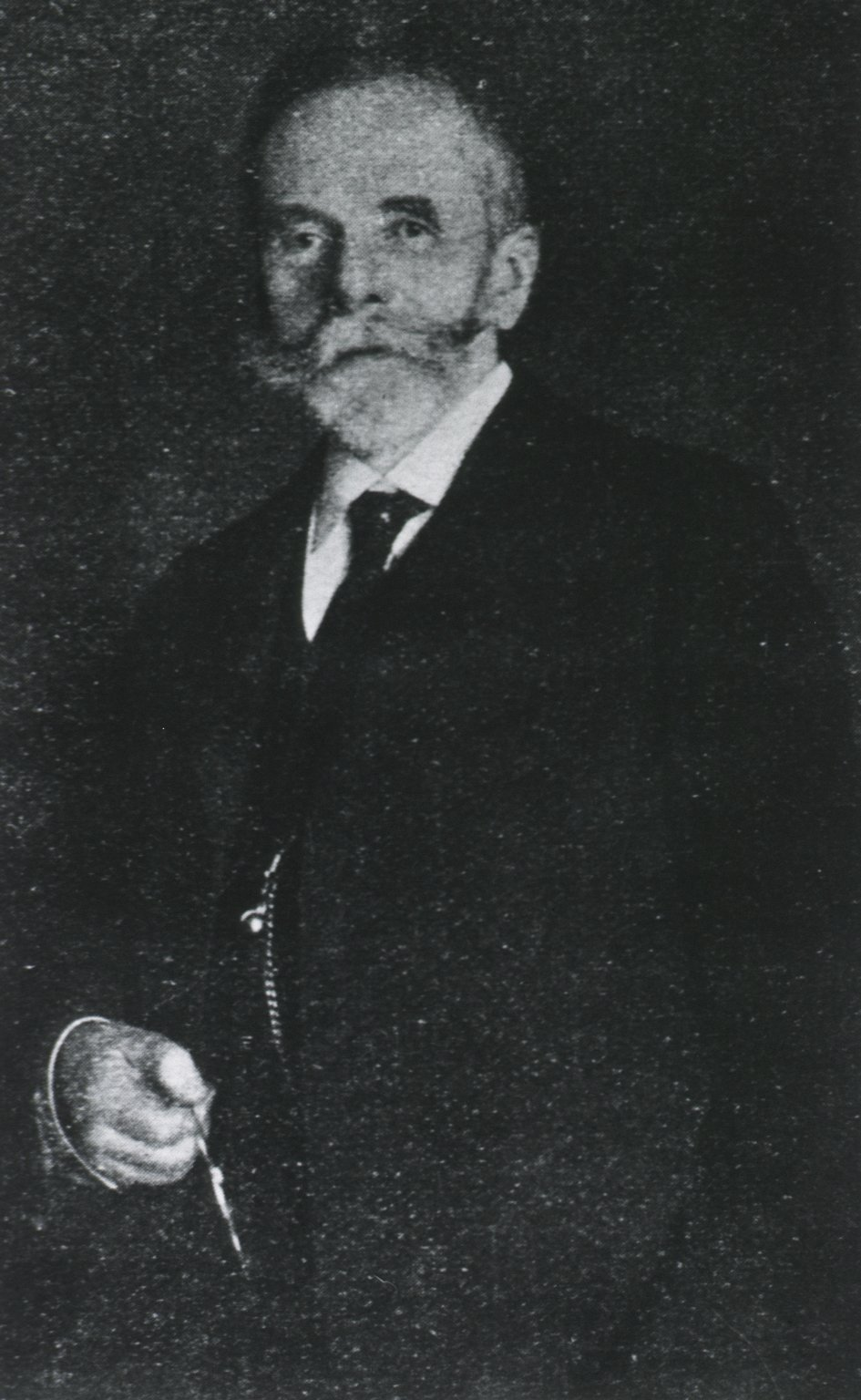
- Born: Heinrich Irenaeus Quincke; 26 August 1842; Frankfurt an der Oder, Prussia (now Germany)
- Died: 19 May 1922 (aged 79); Frankfurt, Germany

Heinrich Irenaeus Quincke (26 August 1842 – 19 May 1922) was a German internist and surgeon. His main contribution to internal medicine was the introduction of the lumbar puncture for diagnostic and therapeutic purposes. After 1874, his main area of research was pulmonary medicine.

== Biography ==
Born at Frankfurt an der Oder, Heinrich was the son of prominent physician Hermann Quincke and the younger brother of physicist Georg Hermann Quincke. He received his doctorate in 1863 from the University of Berlin, having studied previously at the University of Heidelberg and at the University of Würzburg under Rudolf Virchow and Albert von Kölliker.

In 1865, Quincke worked with physiologist Ernst Wilhelm von Brücke at the University of Vienna, and in 1866, he became the assistant to the surgeon Robert Ferdinand Wilms. He was an Assistenzarzt (subordinate physician) in internal medicine under Friedrich Theodor von Frerichs at the Charité in Berlin until 1870.

In 1873, Quincke became a professor of internal medicine at the University of Berne. Five years later, he moved to the University of Kiel and became a professor emeritus in 1908. He died in Frankfurt am Main, where he had been giving lectures until his death.

Quincke received an honorary doctorate (LL.D) from the University of Glasgow in June 1901.

== Discoveries ==
He was perhaps the first (1882) to recognize angioedema, which is often referred to as "Quincke's edema". "Quincke's pulse", with redness and pallor seen under the fingernails, is one of the signs of aortic insufficiency. "Quincke's puncture" is a somewhat outdated eponym for lumbar puncture, used for the examination of the cerebrospinal fluid in numerous diseases such as meningitis and multiple sclerosis. In 1893 he described what is now known as idiopathic intracranial hypertension, which he labeled "serous meningitis".
