= Gustav Rose =

German mineralogist (1798–1873)

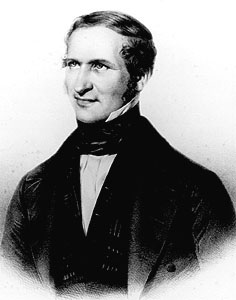
- Born: 18 March 1798; Berlin, Kingdom of Prussia
- Died: 15 July 1873 (aged 75); Berlin, German Empire
- Known for: Meteorite classification Perovskite
- Awards: Pour le Mérite (1871); ForMemRS (1866)
- Scientific career
- Fields: Mineralogy; Meteorites
- Thesis: De Sphenis atque titanitae systemate crystallino (1820)
- Academic advisors: Christian Samuel Weiss; Jöns Jacob Berzelius
- Notable students: Karl Friedrich August Rammelsberg; Gerhard vom Rath; Paul Heinrich von Groth; Alexander Sadebeck

Prof Gustavus ("Gustav") Rose FRSFor HFRSE (18 March 1798 – 15 July 1873) was a German mineralogist who was a native of Berlin. He was President of the German Geological Society from 1863 to 1873.

== Life ==
He was born in Berlin the son of pharmacologist Valentin Rose.

Rose was a graduate of the University of Berlin, where he was a student of mineralogist Christian Samuel Weiss (1780–1856). He also studied under Swedish physical chemist Jöns Jakob Berzelius (1779–1848) in Stockholm. While studying with Berzelius, Rose met German chemist Eilhard Mitscherlich (1794–1863), with whom he maintained a lifelong friendship. Rose provided assistance to Mitscherlich's development of the law of isomorphism. In 1826 he became an associate professor of mineralogy in Berlin. In 1829, with German naturalists Alexander von Humboldt (1769–1859) and Christian Gottfried Ehrenberg (1795–1876), Rose took part in a scientific expedition throughout Imperial Russia. In Russia he performed mineralogical studies in the Altai and Ural Mountains, as well as in the region of the Caspian Sea. In 1856 he was appointed director of the Royal Mineralogical Museum. From 1863 up until his death he was president of the German Geological Society.

== Research ==
Gustav Rose made important contributions in the fields of petrology and crystallography, and is credited for pioneering usage of the reflective goniometer in Germany. He had a particular interest in the relationship between the crystalline form and the physical properties of minerals. He is credited for developing a mineral system that was a combination of chemistry, isomorphy and morphology.

Rose conducted studies of quartz, feldspars, granites, and the mineralogical components of trap rock. He is remembered for research on meteorites and chondrules (grains found in some types of meteorites). With Gustav Tschermak von Seysenegg (1836–1927) and Aristides Brezina (1848–1909), the "Rose-Tschermak-Brezina classification" system of meteorites was developed.

He identified many minerals new to science, including perovskite, named in honor of Russian mineralogist Lev Aleksevich von Perovski (1792–1856). A rose-colored mineral named roselite is named after Rose, and he is credited with coining the terms howardite and eucrite.

== Selected publications ==
- Elemente der Krystallographie (1830) – Elements of crystallography.
- Mineralogischgeognostische Reise nach dem Ural, dem Altai and dem Kaspische Meere (1837) Vol. 1; (1842) Vol. 2. – Mineralogical-gognostic journey to the Urals, the Altai Mountains and the Caspian Sea.
- Das Krystallo-chemische Mineralsystem (1852) – The crystallo-chemical mineral system.
- Rose, Gustav (1864). Beschreibung und Eintheilung der Meteoriten auf Grund der Sammlung im mineralogischen Museum zu Berlin (in German). Berlin: Königlichen Akademie der Wissenschaften: in Commission bei F. Dümmler's Verlags-Buchhandlung Harrwitz und Gossmann. p. 161. – Description and classification of meteorites in the collection at the mineralogical museum of Berlin.

== Family ==
He was a brother of mineralogist Heinrich Rose (1795–1864) and the father of noted surgeon Edmund Rose (1836–1914) and the classicist Valentin Rose (1829–1916).

== See also ==
- Glossary of meteoritics
- Perovskites
- Perovskite nanocrystals
