= Christian Samuel Weiss =

German mineralogist (1780–1856)

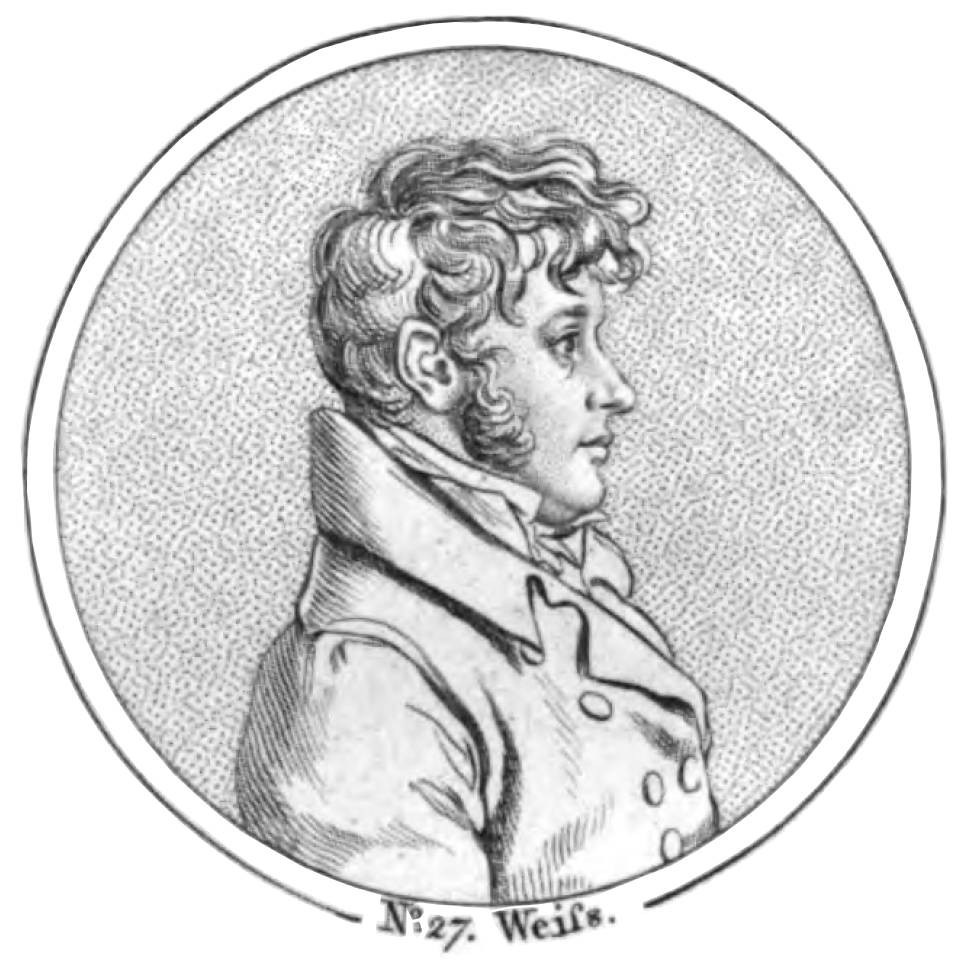
- Born: 26 February 1780; Leipzig, Germany
- Died: 1 October 1856 (aged 76); Cheb, Austrian Empire
- Education: Leipzig University
- Scientific career
- Fields: Physics; Mineralogy; Mathematics
- Doctoral advisor: Abraham Gottlob Werner
- Notable students: Gustav Rose; Franz Ernst Neumann

Christian Samuel Weiss (26 February 1780 – 1 October 1856) was a German mineralogist born in Leipzig.

Following graduation, he worked as a physics instructor in Leipzig from 1803 until 1808. and in the meantime, conducted geological studies of mountain formations in Tyrol, Switzerland and France (1806–08). In 1810 he became a professor of mineralogy at the University of Berlin, where in 1818/19 and 1832/33, he served as university rector. He died near Eger in Bohemia.

Weiss is credited for creating parameters of modern crystallography, and was instrumental in making it a branch of mathematical science. He stressed the significance of direction in crystals, considering crystallographic axes to be a possible basis for classification of crystals. He is credited for introducing the categorization schema of crystal systems, and has a basic law of crystallography named after him called the "Weiss zone law".

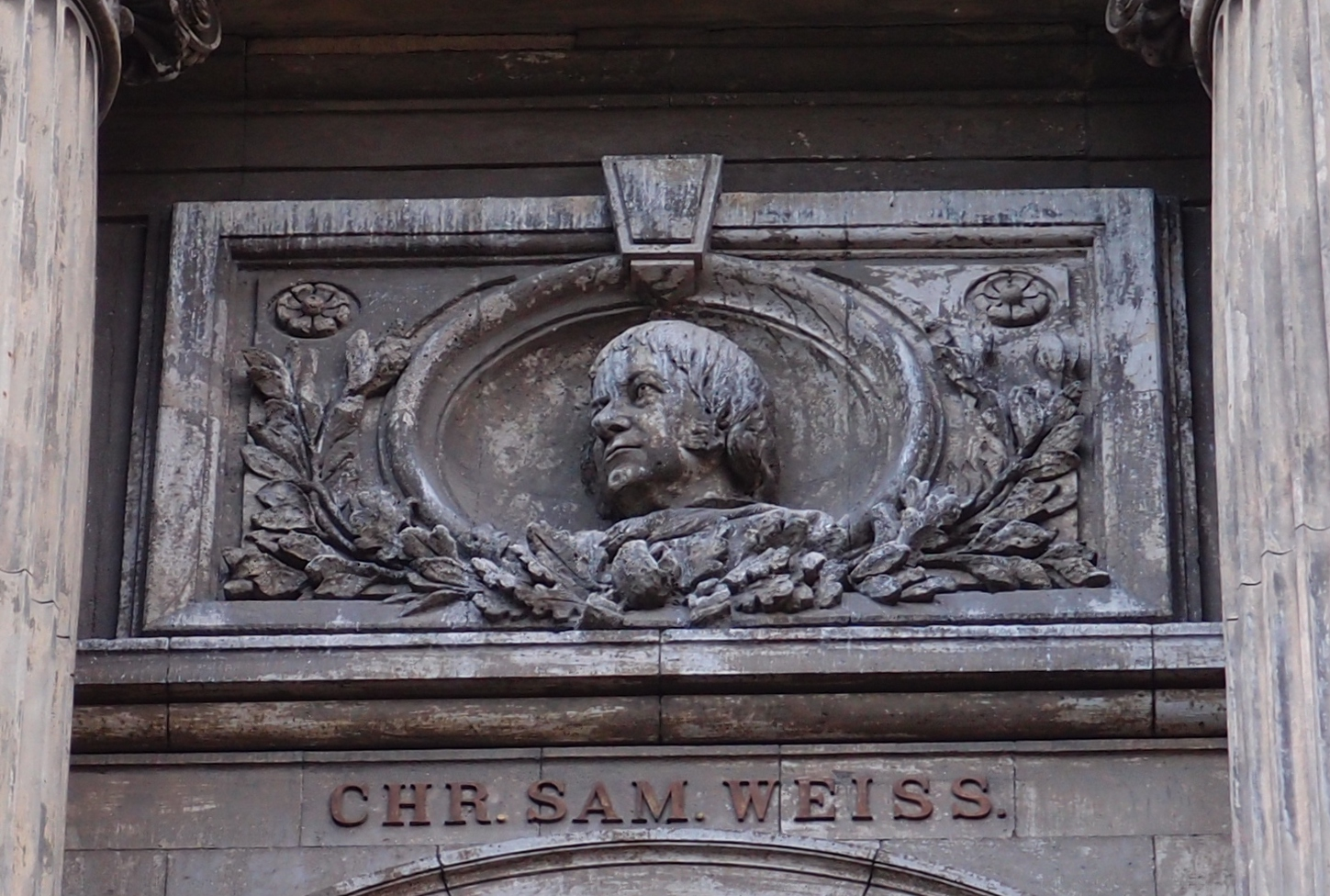
Relief of Christian Samuel Weiss at the entrance of the Naturkundemuseum in Berlin-Mitte.

== Works by Weiss that have been translated into English ==
- "On the methodical and natural distribution of the different systems of crystallisation" Edinburgh : Printed for A. Constable, 1823.
- "On the crystallographic discoveries and systems of Mohs and Weiss" (with Friedrich Mohs); Edinburgh : Printed for A. Constable, 1823.

== See also ==
- Geometrical crystallography before X-rays
