= Adolph Ferdinand Duflos =

German chemist and pharmacist (1802–1889)

Adolph Ferdinand Duflos (2 February 1802, in Artenay – 9 October 1889, in Annaberg) was a French-born, German pharmacist and chemist.

Orphaned at a young age due to the loss of both parents, he was taken in by his uncle, a French military physician. After his uncle's death during the Russian campaign of 1812, he was adopted by the rector of the lyceum in Torgau. From 1830 to 1833 he studied natural sciences and chemistry at the University of Halle, afterwards working as a pharmacist's assistant, then serving as director of a chemical factory in Breslau.

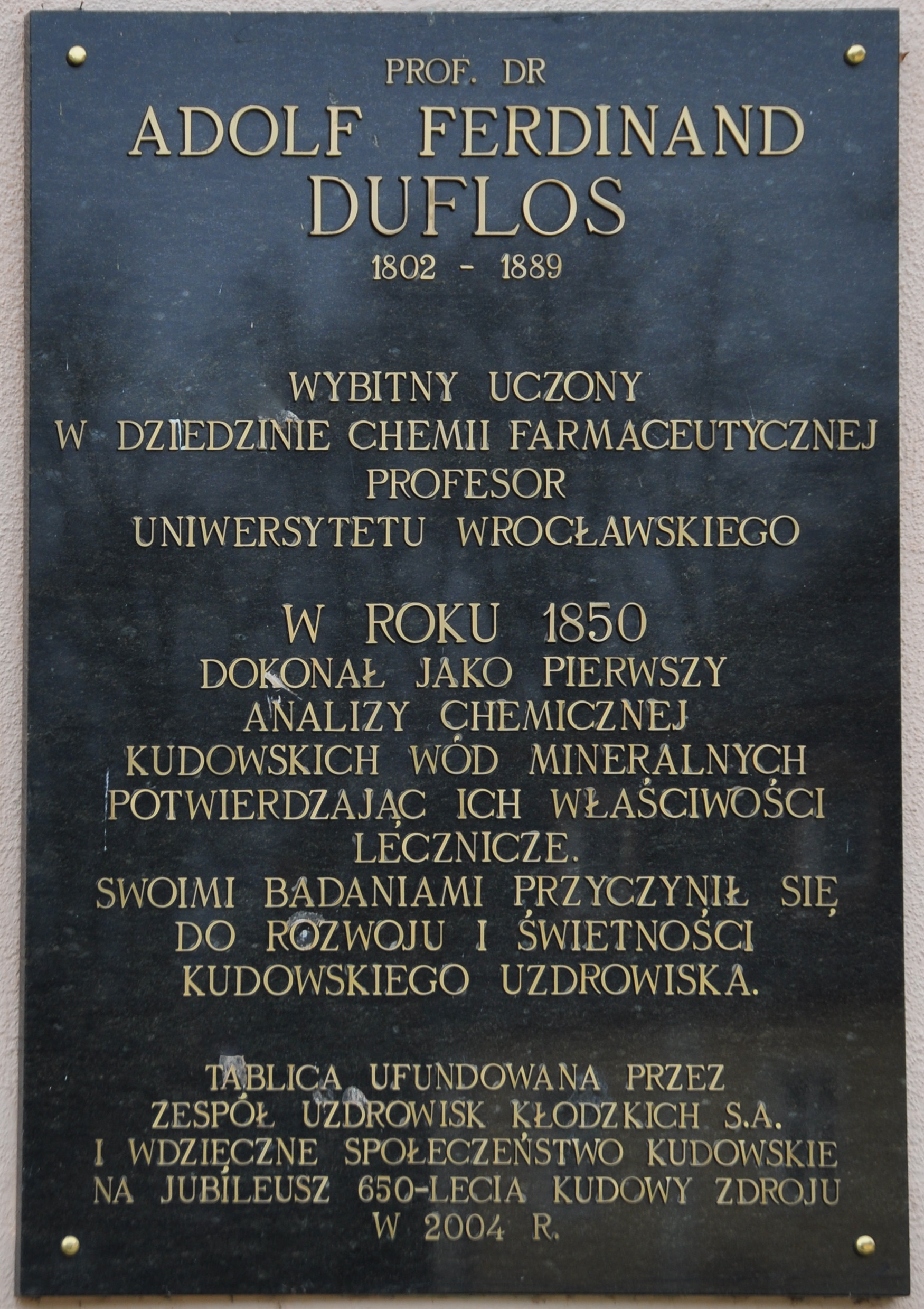
Commemorative plaque of Adolph Ferdinand Duflos in Kudowa-Zdrój.

In 1842 he obtained his habilitation, and soon afterwards was named director of the pharmacy institute at the University of Breslau. In 1846 he became an associate professor of pharmaceutical chemistry at Breslau, attaining a full professorship in 1859. Serious eye problems forced his retirement from the university in 1866.

== Published works ==
He was the author of numerous papers dealing with subjects in the fields of pharmaceutical and analytical chemistry. His chemical-apothecary book, "Chemisches Apothekerbuch : Theorie und Praxis der in pharmaceutischen Laboratorien vorkommenden pharmaceutisch-, technisch- und analytisch-chemischen Arbeiten" (6th edition 1880) was for many years considered to be the best and most practical work in the German language in regards to pharmaceutical chemistry and for use in pharmacy laboratories. Other noteworthy written efforts by Duflos include:

- Theorie und Praxis der pharmaceutischen Experimentalchemie oder erfahrungsmässige Anweisung zur rightigen Ausführung und Würdigung der in den pharmaceutischen Laboratorien, 1841.
- Die wichtigsten lebensbedürfnisse, ihre aechtheit und güte, ihre zufälligen verunreinigungen und ihre absichtlichen verfalschungen, auf chemischem wege erläutert, etc. 1842.
- Chemisches Apothekerbuch : Theorie und Praxis der pharmaceutischen Experimentalchemie, 1847 – Chemical-pharmacist book: Theory and practice of pharmaceutical experimental chemistry
- Handbuch der angewandten, pharmaceutisch- und technisch-chemischen analyse als anleitung zur prüfung chemischer arzneimittel und zur visitation der apotheken, etc. 1871 – Handbook of applied pharmaceutical and technical-chemical analysis used as a guide for testing chemical drugs, etc.
