= Heinrich Rose =

German mineralogist and chemist (1795–1864)

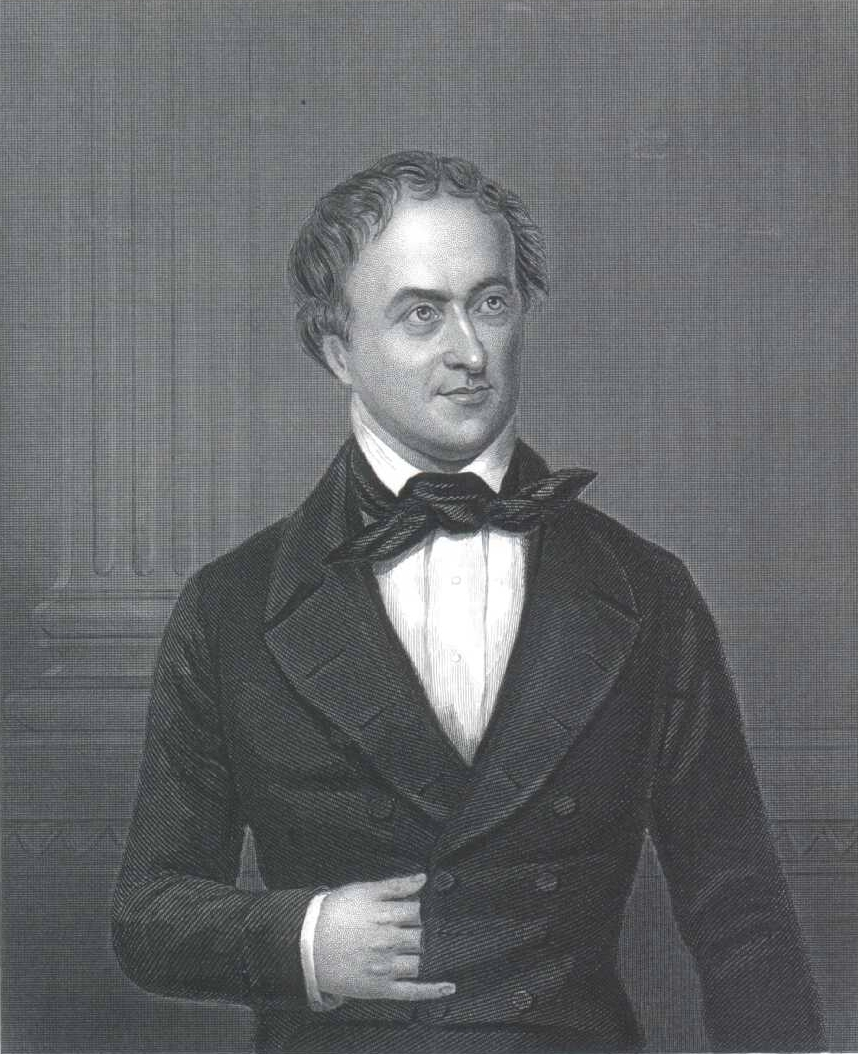
- Heinrich Rose
- Born: 6 August 1795; Berlin
- Died: 27 January 1864 (aged 68); Berlin
- Known for: rediscovered and naming of niobium
- Awards: Pour le Mérite (1861); ForMemRS (1842)
- Scientific career
- Doctoral advisor: Jöns Jakob Berzelius

Heinrich Rose (6 August 1795 – 27 January 1864) was a German mineralogist and analytical chemist. He was the brother of the mineralogist Gustav Rose and a son of Valentin Rose. Rose's early works on phosphorescence were noted in the Quarterly Journal of Science in 1821, and on the strength of these works, he was elected privatdozent at the University of Berlin from 1822, then Professor from 1832.

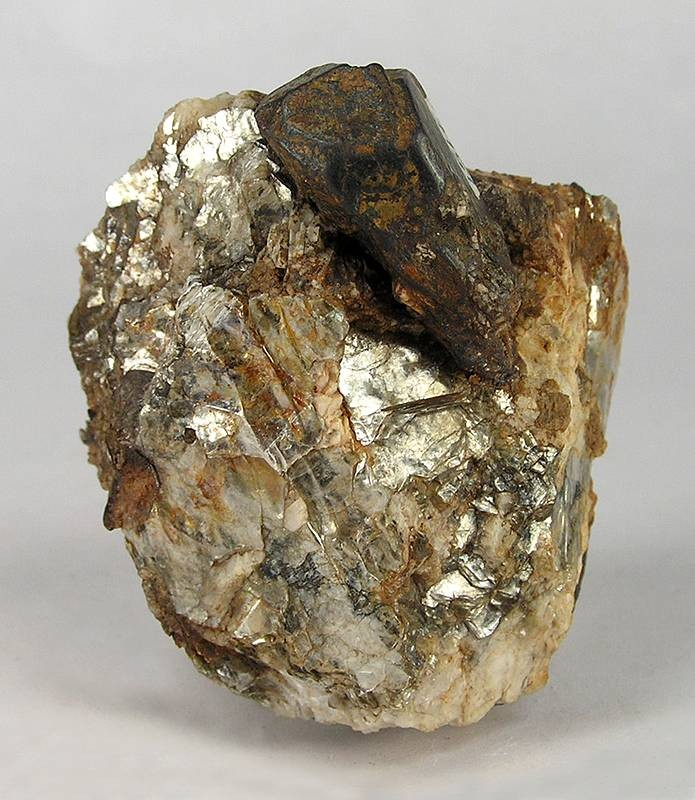
The mineral columbite

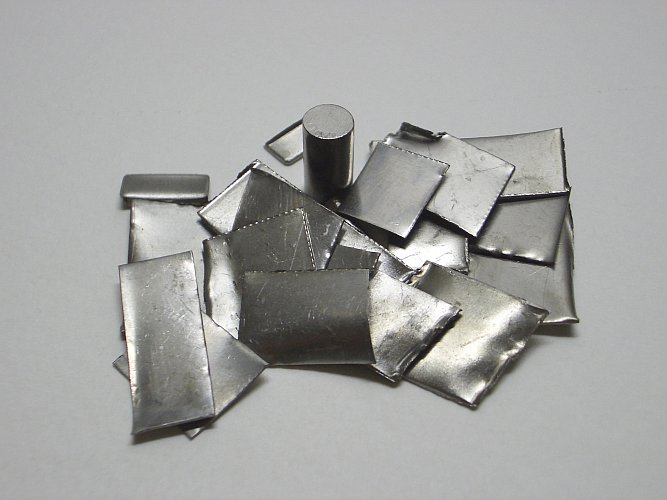
The element niobium

In 1846, Rose rediscovered the chemical element niobium, proving conclusively that it was different from tantalum. This confirmed that Charles Hatchett had discovered niobium in 1801 in columbite ore. Hatchett had named the new element "columbium", from the ore in which niobium and tantalum coexist. The element was eventually assigned the name niobium by the IUPAC in 1950 after Niobe, the daughter of Tantalus in Greek mythology.

In 1845, Rose published the discovery of a new element pelopium, which he had found in the mineral tantalite. After subsequent research, pelopium was identified to be a mixture of tantalum and niobium.

In 1830, Heinrich Rose was elected a foreign member of the Royal Swedish Academy of Sciences. He was elected to the American Philosophical Society in 1860.

== Works ==
- Handbuch der analytischen Chemie . Vol.1&2 . Mittler, Berlin 1833–1834 Digital edition by the University and State Library Düsseldorf
