= List of mineralogists =

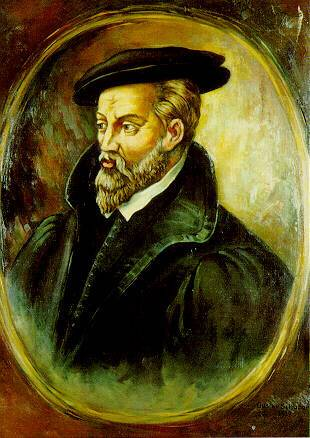
Agricola, "father of mineralogy".

The following is a list of notable mineralogists and other people who made notable contributions to mineralogy. Included are winners of major mineralogy awards such as the Dana Medal and the Roebling Medal. Mineralogy is a subject of geology specializing in the scientific study of chemistry, crystal structure, and physical (including optical) properties of minerals and mineralized artifacts.

== A ==
- Joan Abella (born 1968)
- Otto Wilhelm Hermann von Abich (1806–1886)
- Johan Afzelius (1753–1837)
- Stuart Olof Agrell (1913–1996)
- Georgius Agricola (1494–1555) – author of De re metallica
- Arthur Aikin (1773–1854)
- Thomas Allan (1777–1833)
- François Alluaud (1778–1866)
- Gregori Aminoff (1883–1947)
- Charles Anderson (1876–1944)
- José Bonifácio de Andrade e Silva (1763–1838)
- Matthias Joseph Anker (1771–1843)

== B ==
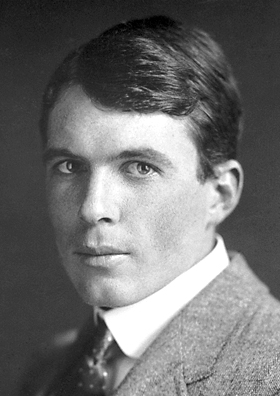
William Lawrence Bragg

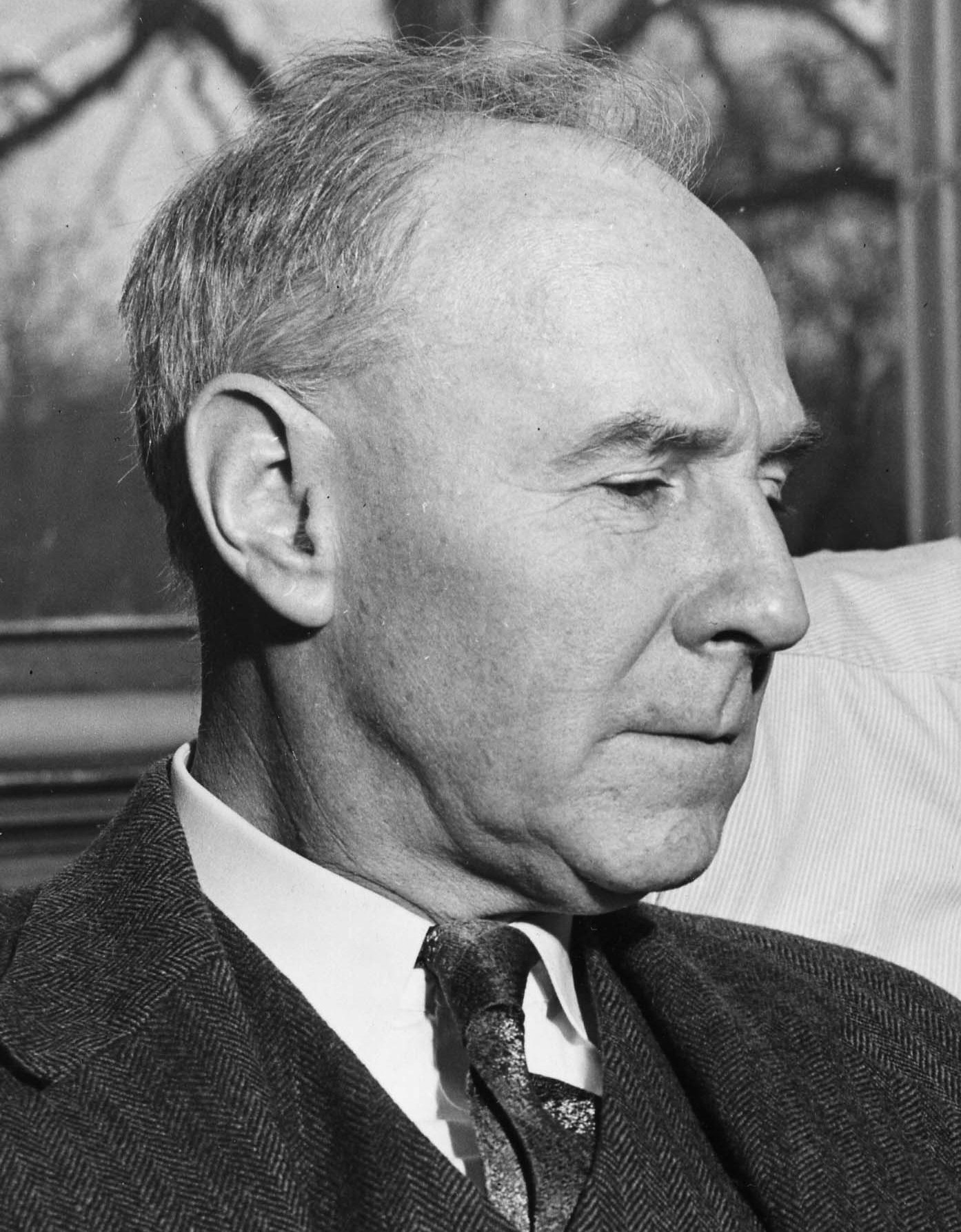
Norman Bowen

- William Babington (1756–1833)
- Giuseppe Gabriel Balsamo-Crivelli (1800–1874)
- Andrew Ketcham Barnett (1852–1914)
- Hilary Bauerman (1835–1909)
- Lewis Caleb Beck (1798–1853)
- Friedrich Johann Karl Becke (1855–1931)
- Nikolay Belov (1891–1982)
- Torbern Bergman (1735–1784) – Related forms of calcite to cleavage
- Martine Bertereau (1600–1642)
- Émile Bertrand (1844–1909)
- Marcel Alexandre Bertrand (1847–1907)
- Friedrich Martin Berwerth (1850–1918)
- Jöns Jacob Berzelius (1779–1848)
- François Sulpice Beudant (1787–1850)
- Johannes Martin Bijvoet (1892–1980)
- Luca Bindi (born 1971)
- Maynard Bixby (1853–1935)
- Harald Bjørlykke (1901–1968)
- William Phipps Blake (1826–1910)
- Johann Reinhard Blum (1802–1883)
- Hendrik Enno Boeke (1881–1918)
- Anselmus de Boodt (1550–1632)
- Ignaz von Born (1742–1791)
- Jacques Louis, Comte de Bournon (1751–1825)
- Norman L. Bowen (1887–1956) – known for Bowen's reaction series
- Stanley Bowie (1917–2008)
- William Lawrence Bragg (1890–1971) – known for Bragg's law of diffraction and Atomic Structures of Minerals
- Georg Brandt (1694–1768)
- Auguste Bravais (1811–1863)
- August Breithaupt (1791–1873)
- Vesselina Breskovska (1928–1997)
- Aristides Brezina (1848–1909)
- A. J. M. Brochant de Villiers (1772–1840)
- Waldemar Christofer Brøgger (1851–1940)
- Alexandre Brongniart (1770–1847)
- Henry James Brooke (1771–1857)
- Archibald Bruce (1777–1818)
- Franz Ernst Brückmann (1697–1753)
- Morten Thrane Brünnich (1737–1827)
- George Jarvis Brush (1831–1912)
- Arthur Francis Buddington (1890–1980)
- Martin Julian Buerger (1903–1986)
- Richard Büttner (1858–1927)

== C ==
- Louis J. Cabri (born 1934)
- Frédéric Cailliaud (1787–1869)
- Joseph Campbell (1856–1933)
- Franz Ludwig von Cancrin (1738–1812)
- Ian S. E. Carmichael (1930–2011)
- George Washington Carpenter (1802–1860)
- Alexandre-Emile Béguyer de Chancourtois (1820–1886)
- Maurice Chaper (1834–1896)
- Edward Daniel Clarke (1769–1822)
- John George Children (1777–1852)
- Charles L. Christ (1916–1980)
- Hartvig Caspar Christie (1826–1873)
- Jean de Chastelet (1578–1645)
- Parker Cleaveland (1780–1858)
- Enrico Clerici (1862–1938)
- Emil Cohen (1842–1905)
- Joseph Henry Collins (1841–1916)
- Arthur Connell (1794–1863)
- Douglas Saxon "Doug" Coombs (1924–2016)
- Pierre Louis Antoine Cordier (1777–1861)
- Hubert Curien (1924–2005)

== D ==
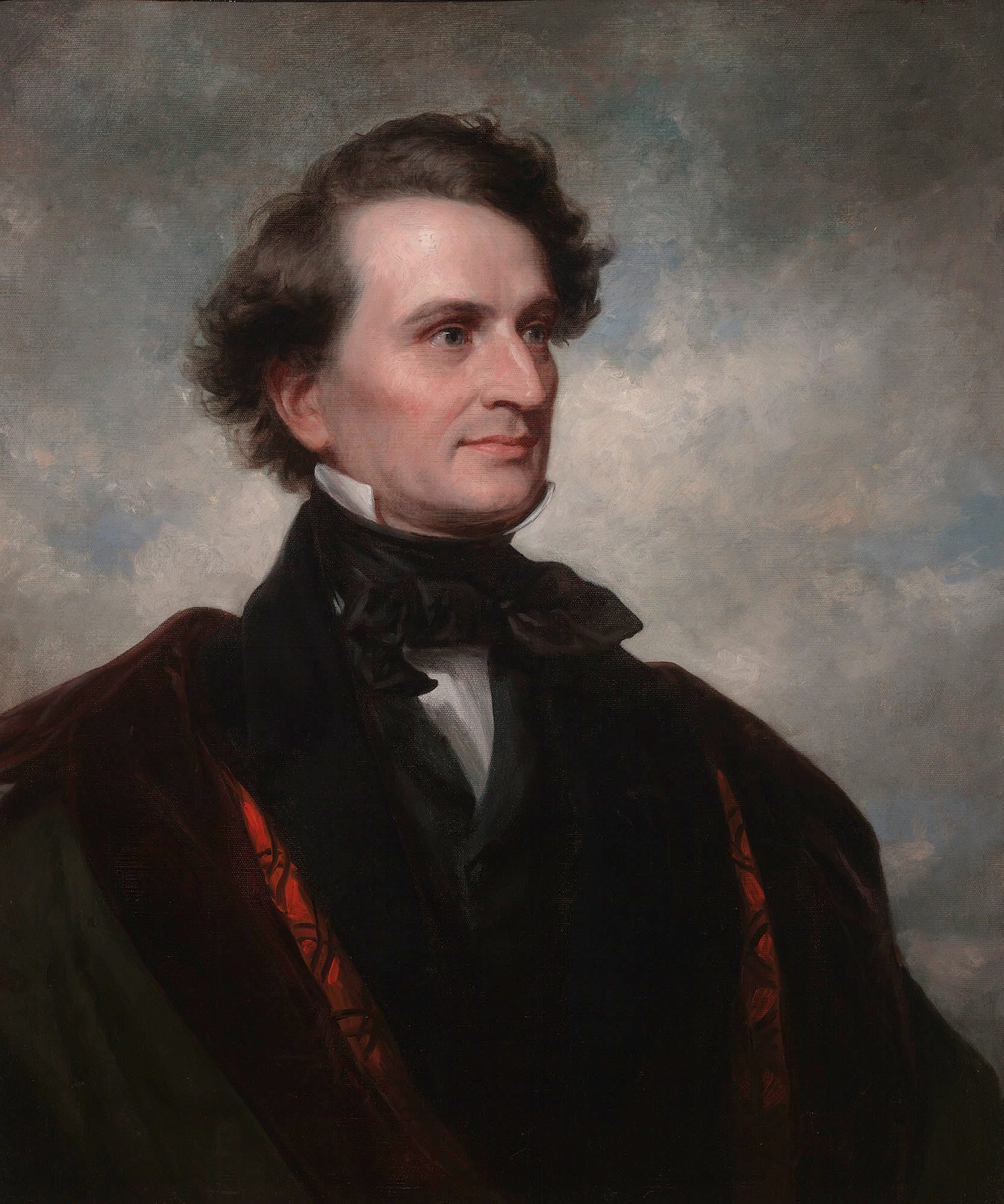
Dana developed the modern system of mineral classification.

- Antonio D'Achiardi (1839–1902)
- Tellef Dahll (1825–1893)
- Alexis Damour (1808–1902)
- Edward Salisbury Dana (1849–1935)
- James Dwight Dana (1813–1895)
- James Freeman Dana (1793–1827)
- Louis-Jean-Marie Daubenton (1716–1800)
- William Alexander Deer (1910–2009)
- Jean-Claude Delamétherie (1743–1817)
- Achille Ernest Oscar Joseph Delesse (1817–1881)
- Alfred Des Cloizeaux (1817–1897)
- Ignacy Domeyko (1802–1889)
- Armand Petit-Dufrénoy (1792–1857)

== E ==
- Harry von Eckermann (1886–1969)
- Thomas Egleston (1832–1897)
- Wilhelm Eitel (1891–1979)
- Wolf von Engelhardt (1910–2008)
- Otto Erdmannsdörffer (1876–1955)
- Gundolf Ernst (1930–2002)
- W. Gary Ernst (born 1931)
- Berend George Escher (1885–1967)
- Jens Esmark (1763–1839)
- Morten Thrane Esmark (1801–1882)
- Hans P. Eugster (1925–1987)
- Rodney C. Ewing (born 1946)

== F ==
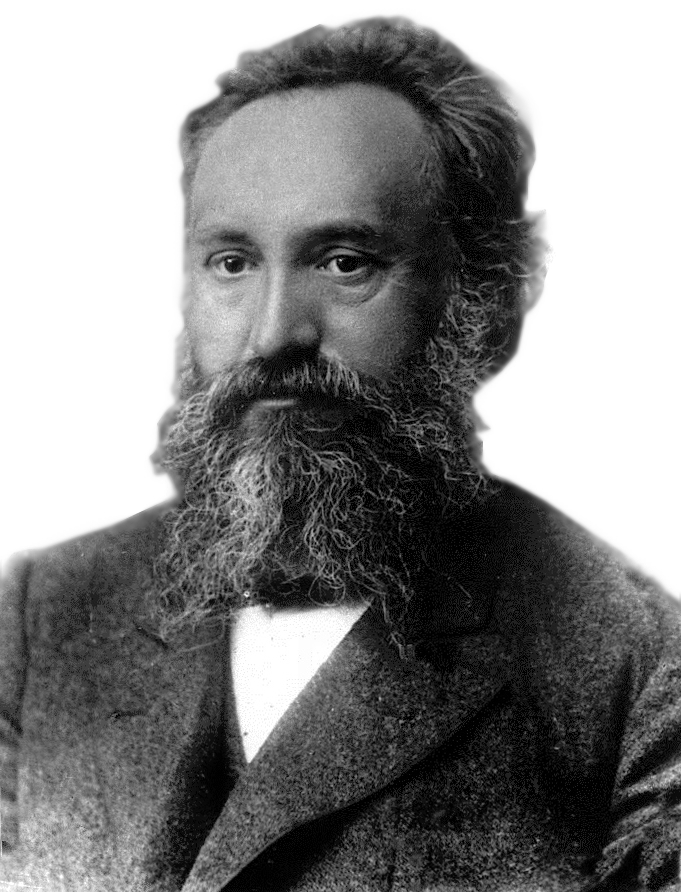
Evgraf Fedorov worked out the 230 space groups of crystallographic symmetry.

- Evgraf Fedorov (1853–1919)
- Walter Frederick Ferrier (1865–1950)
- Aleksandr Evgen’evich Fersman (1883–1945)
- João da Silva Feijó (1760–1824)
- Leopold Heinrich Fischer (1817–1886)
- John Flett (1869–1947)
- Walter Flight (1841–1885)
- Gustaf Flink (1848–1931)
- David Forbes (1828–1876)
- Johan Georg Forchhammer (1794–1865)
- Adolarius Jacob Forster (1739–1806)
- Westgarth Forster (1772–1835)
- William F. Foshag (1894–1956)
- Clement le Neve Foster (1841–1904)
- Samuel Fowler (1779–1844)
- Robert Were Fox the Younger (1789–1877)
- Friedrich August Frenzel (1842–1902)
- Charles Friedel (1832–1899)
- Georges Friedel (1865–1933)
- Günther Friedrich (1929–2014)
- Johann Nepomuk von Fuchs (1774–1856)
- William Fyfe (1927–2013)

== G ==
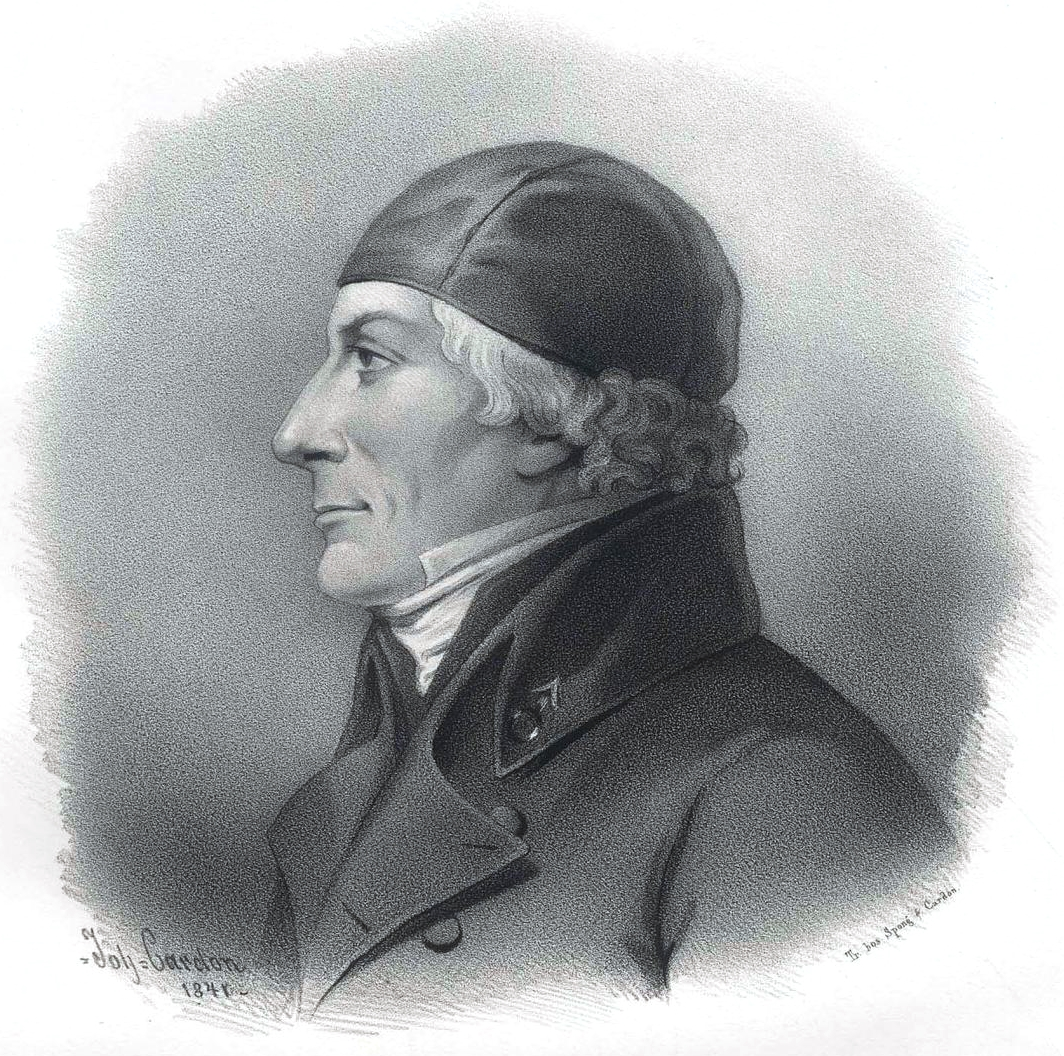
Johan Gottlieb Gahn

- Johan Gadolin (1760–1852)
- Johan Gottlieb Gahn (1745–1818) – developed blowpipe technique for identifying minerals
- Robert Garrels (1916–1988)
- Kurt von Gehlen (1927–1995)
- Johann Carl Gehler (1732–1796)
- Eugen Geinitz (1854–1925)
- Hanns Bruno Geinitz (1814–1900)
- Frederick Augustus Genth (1820–1893)
- Ernst Friedrich Germar (1786–1853)
- George Gibbs (1777–1834)
- Heinrich Girard (1814–1878)
- Ernst Friedrich Glocker (1793–1858)
- Johann Wolfgang von Goethe (1749–1832)
- Georg August Goldfuss (1782–1848)
- Victor Mordechai Goldschmidt (1853–1933) – crystal chemistry and geochemistry
- Edward Goldsmith (mineralogist) (late 19th century)
- Julian Royce Goldsmith (1918–1999)
- Claude-Henri Gorceix (1842–1919)
- Wilhelm Joseph Grailich (1829–1859)
- William Gregor (1761–1817)
- James Gregory (1832–1899)
- Ralph Early Grim (1902–1989)
- Paul Heinrich Ritter von Groth (1843–1927) – established relations between crystal form and structure
- Jean-Étienne Guettard (1715–1786)

== H ==
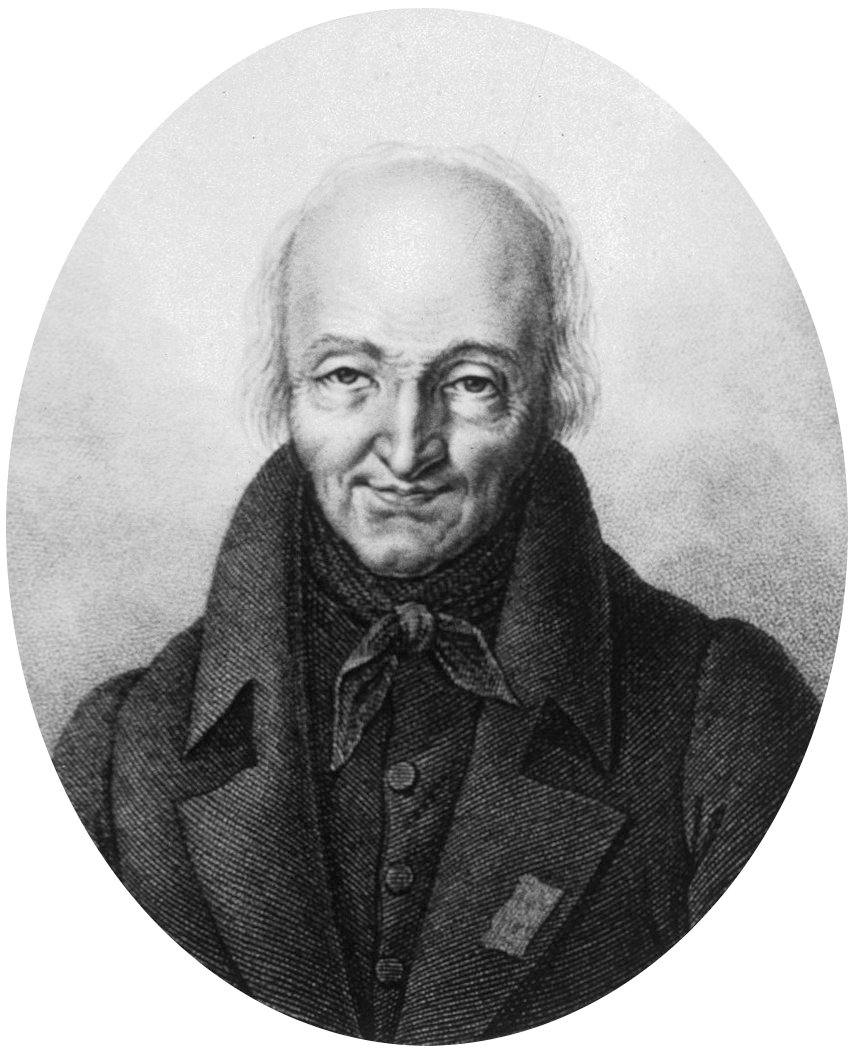
René Just Haüy, "Father of modern crystallography".

- Paula Hahn-Weinheimer (1917–2002)
- Wilhelm Karl Ritter von Haidinger (1795–1871)
- Axel Hamberg (1863–1933)
- Peggy-Kay Hamilton (1922–1959)
- Johann Friedrich Ludwig Hausmann (1782–1859)
- Paul Hautefeuille (1836–1902)
- René Just Haüy (1743–1822) – discovered the law of rational indices
- Frank C. Hawthorne (born 1946)
- Robert Hazen (born 1948)
- Matthew Forster Heddle (1828–1897)
- Johann F. C. Hessel (1796–1872)
- John Henry Heuland (1778–1856)
- Carl Hintze (1851–1916)
- Thorstein Hiortdahl (1839–1925)
- Marjorie Hooker (1908–1976)
- Warren D. Huff
- Alexander von Humboldt (1769–1859)
- Arthur Hutchinson (1866–1937)

== J ==
- Robert Jameson (1774–1854)
- M. Qasim Jan (born 1944)
- William W. Jefferis (1820–1906)

== K ==
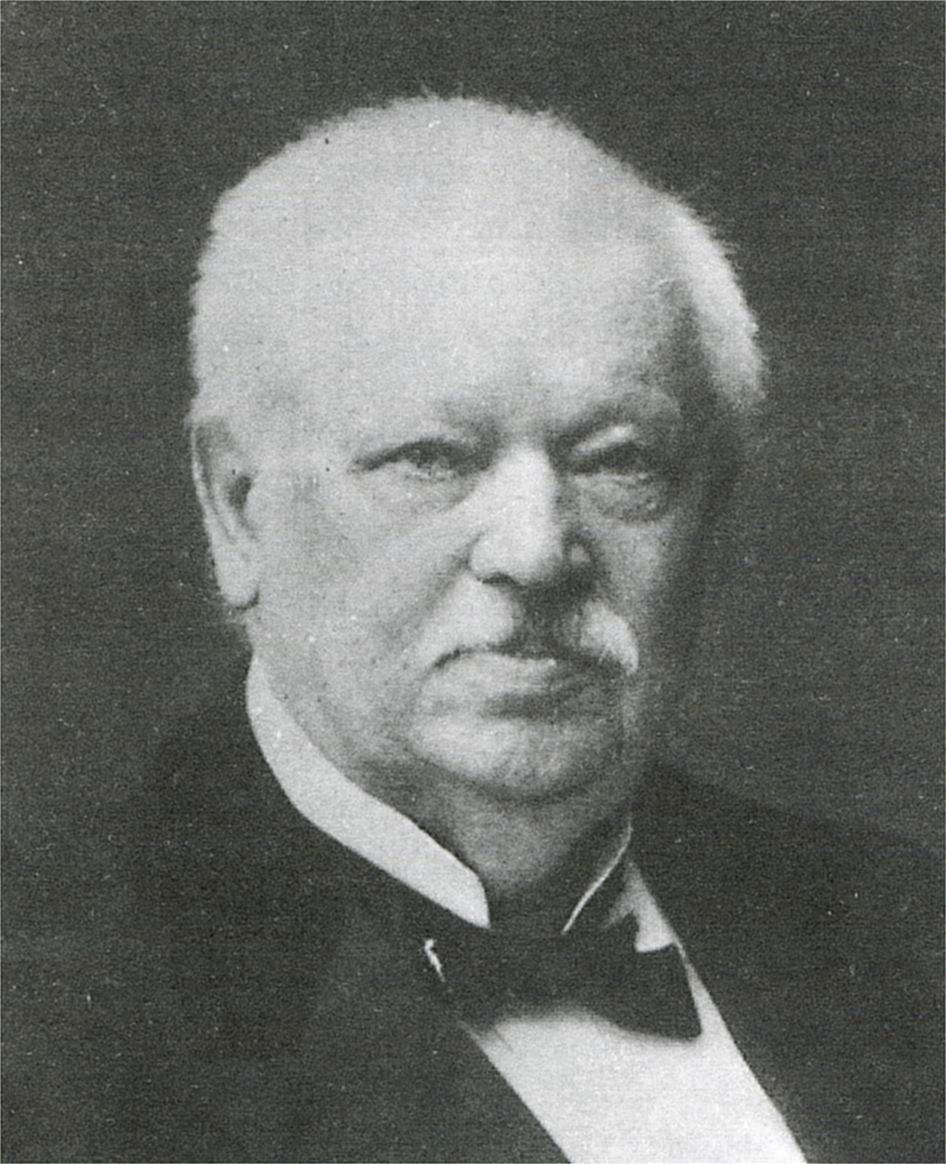
Koksharov was noted for his measurements of minerals using a goniometer.

- Alexander Petrovich Karpinsky (1846–1936)
- Dietrich Ludwig Gustav Karsten (1768–1810)
- Karl Johann Bernhard Karsten (1782–1853)
- Friedrich Katzer (1861–1925)
- Gustav Adolph Kenngott (1818–1897)
- Friedrich Klockmann (1858–1937)
- Adolf Knop (1828–1893)
- Adolph Knopf (1882–1966)
- Wolfgang Franz von Kobell (1803–1882)
- Rudolf Koechlin (1862–1939)
- Nikolay Koksharov (1818–1893)
- Johann Heinrich Kopp (1777–1858)
- Ivan Kostov Nikolov (1913–2004)
- Karl von Kraatz-Koschlau (1867–1900)
- Adam August Krantz (1808–1872)
- Edward Henry Kraus (1875–1973)
- József Sándor Krenner (1839–1920)
- Leonid Kulik (1883–1942)
- George Frederick Kunz (1856–1932)
- Nikolai Semenovich Kurnakov (1860–1941)
- Johann Gottlob von Kurr (1798–1870)

== L ==
- Antoine François Alfred Lacroix (1863–1948)
- Arnold von Lasaulx (1839–1886)
- André Laugier (1770–1832)
- Gillet de Laumont (1747–1834)
- Fritz Laves (1906–1978)
- Johann Gottlieb Lehmann (1719–1767)
- Oskar Lenz (1848–1925)
- Gustav von Leonhard (1816–1878)
- Karl Cäsar von Leonhard (1779–1862)
- William Garrow Lettsom (1805–1887)
- Armand Lévy (1795–1841)
- William Lewis (1847–1926)
- Li Shizhen (1518–1593)
- Henry Carvill Lewis (1853–1888)
- Theodor Liebisch (1852–1922)
- Gottlob Linck (1858–1947)
- Carl von Linné (1707–1778)
- Henri Longchambon (1896–1969)
- Karl August Lossen (1841–1893)

== M ==
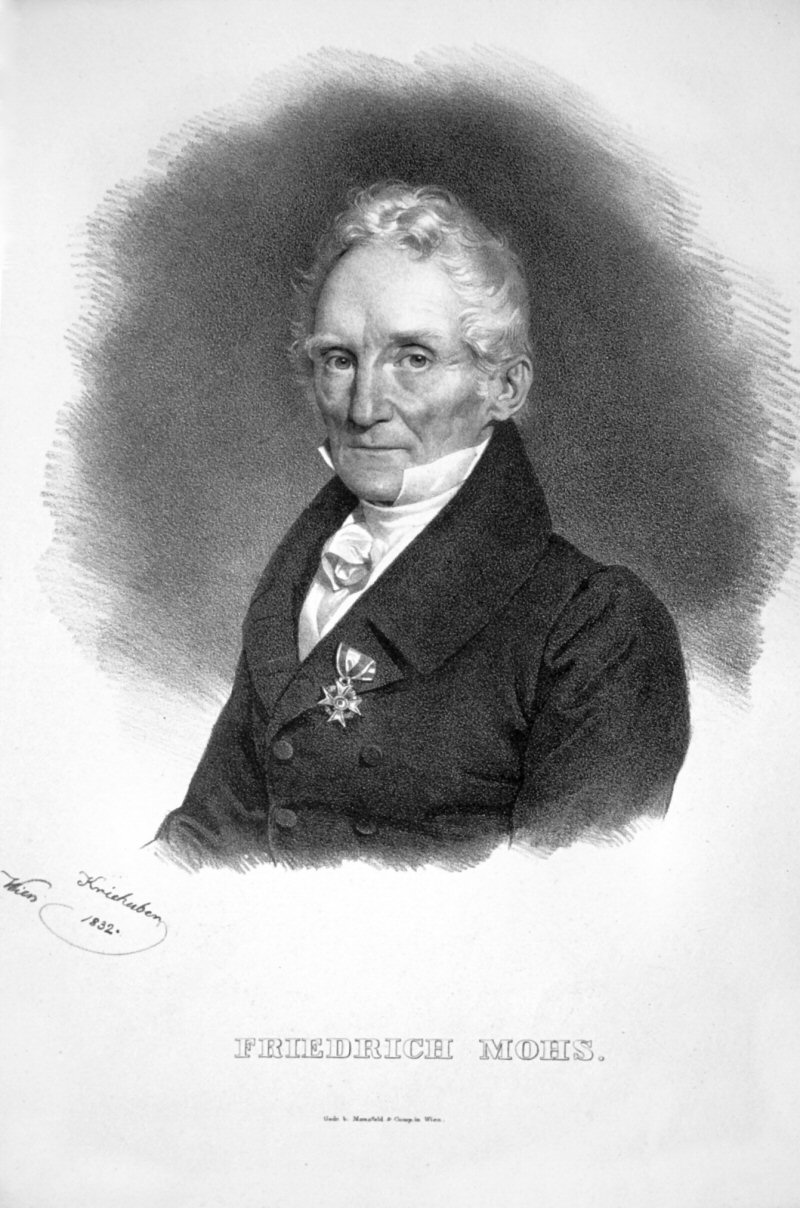
Friedrich Mohs (lithograph by Joseph Kriehuber, 1832)

- Felix Karl Ludwig Machatschki (1895–1970)
- George Mackenzie (1780–1848)
- Ernest-François Mallard (1833–1894)
- Joseph A. Mandarino (1929–2007)
- Ho-Kwang Mao (born 1941)
- Brian Harold Mason (1917–2009)
- Johannes Mathesius (1504–1565)
- Charles-Victor Mauguin (1878–1958)
- John Mawe (1764–1829)
- Sarah Mawe (1767–1846)
- Marshall McDonald (1835–1895)
- Helen Megaw (1907–2002) – first woman to receive the Roebling Medal of the Mineralogical Society of America
- Giuseppe Giovanni Antonio Meneghini (1811–1889)
- Luiz Alberto Dias Menezes (1950–2014)
- Ludwig Meyn (1820–1878)
- Auguste Michel-Lévy (1844–1911)
- Henry Alexander Miers (1858–1942)
- William Hallowes Miller (1801–1880)
- Stanley Robert Mitchell (1881–1963)
- Eilhard Mitscherlich (1794–1863)
- Friedrich Mohs (1773–1839)
- Jean-André Mongez (1750–1788)
- Otto Mügge (1858–1932)

== N ==
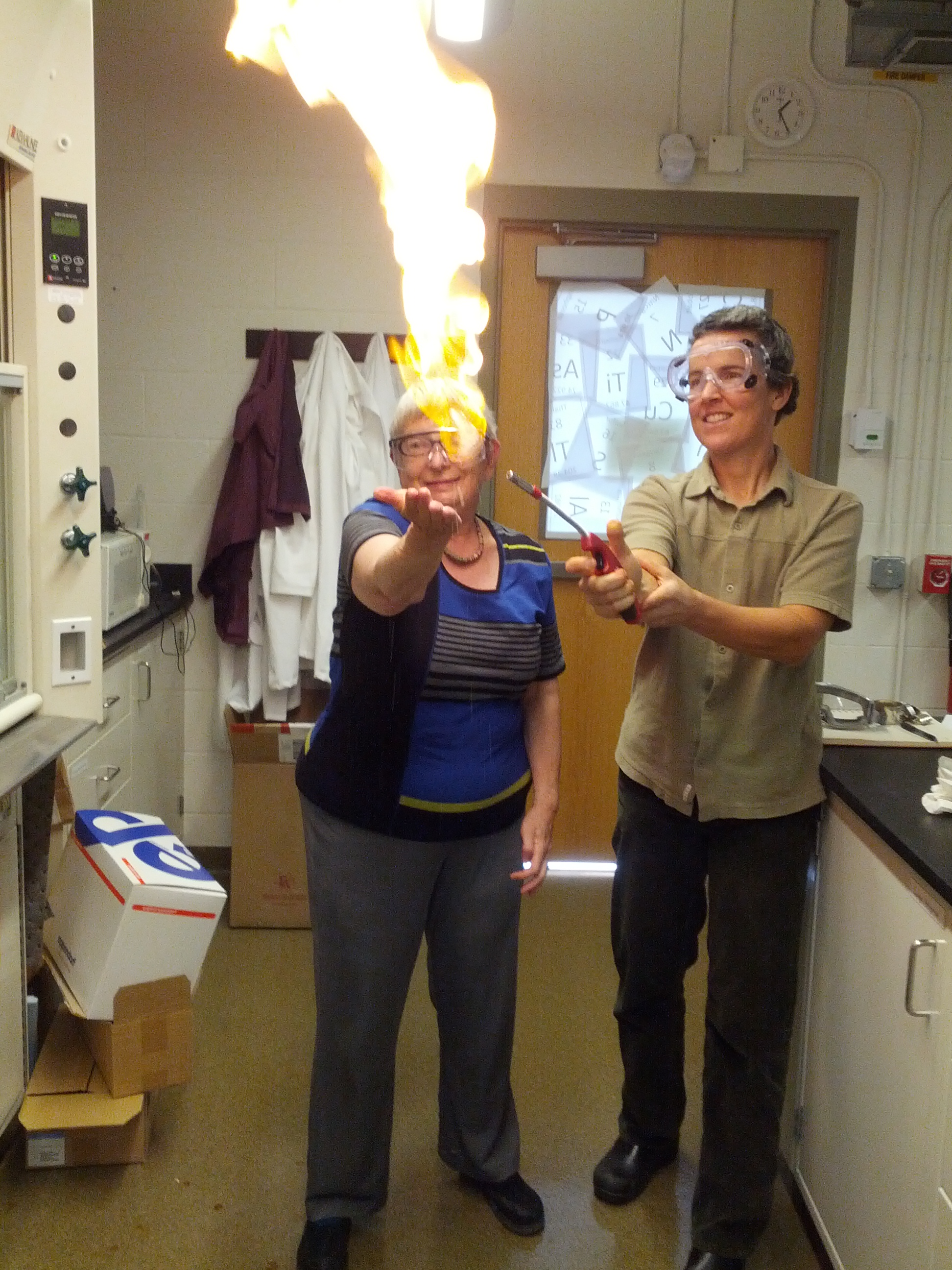
Alexandra Navrotsky in 2012

- Alexandra Navrotsky (born 1943)
- Franz Ernst Neumann (1798–1895)
- Ernest Henry Nickel (1925–2009)
- James Nicol (1810–1879)
- Paul Niggli (1888–1953)
- William Niven (1850–1937)
- Johann Jakob Nöggerath (1788–1877)
- Adolf Erik Nordenskiöld (1832–1901)
- Nils Gustaf Nordenskiöld (1792–1866)
- George Lorenzo Noyes (1863–1945)

== O ==
- Konrad Oebbeke (1853–1932)

== P ==
- Adolf Pabst (1899–1990)
- Charles Palache (1869–1954)
- Pierre Bernard Palassou (1745–1830)
- Eugène Louis Melchior Patrin (1742–1815)
- Linus Carl Pauling (1901–1994)
- Lev Perovski (1792–1856)
- Carlo Perrier (1886–1948)
- Ours-Pierre-Armand Petit-Dufrénoy (1792–1857)
- William Phillips (1775–1829)
- William Pinch (1940–2017)
- Félix Pisani (1831–1920)
- Pliny (23–79)
- Erika Pohl-Ströher (1919–2016)
- Petru Poni (1841–1925)
- Alexander Postels (1801–1871)
- Charles T. Prewitt (1933–2022)
- George Thurland Prior (1862–1936)

== R ==
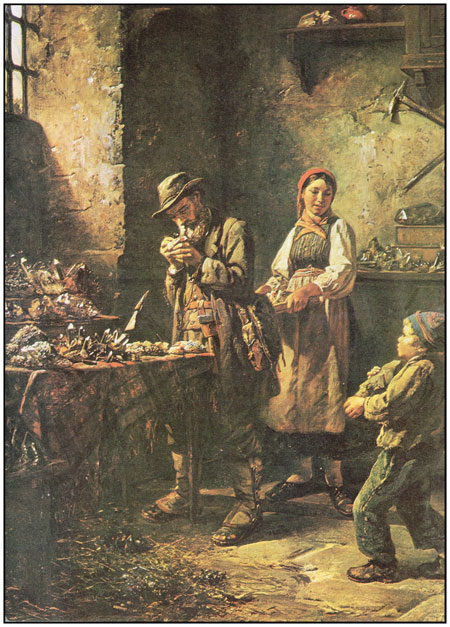
Der Mineraloge, by Rafael Ritz (1883). Thought to depict Gerhard vom Rath examining mineral specimens.

- Paul Ramdohr (1890–1985)
- Karl Friedrich August Rammelsberg (1813–1899)
- Philip Rashleigh (1729–1811)
- Gerhard vom Rath (1830–1888)
- Karl Georg von Raumer (1783–1865)
- Franz-Joseph Müller von Reichenstein (1740–1825/1826)
- Adolf Remelé (1839–1915)
- Alphonse François Renard (1842–1903)
- Anders Jahan Retzius (1742–1821)
- Franz Ambrosius Reuss (1761–1830)
- Friedrich Rinne (1863–1933)
- Mariano Eduardo de Rivero y Ustáriz (1798–1857)
- Jean-Baptiste L. Romé de l'Isle (1736–1790)
- Alexander Rose (1781–1860)
- Gustav Rose (1798–1873)
- Harry Rosenbusch (1836–1914)
- Karl Rössler (1788–1863)
- George R. Rossman (born 1944)
- Justus Ludwig Adolf Roth (1818–1892)
- François Michel de Rozière (1775–1842)
- Frank Rutley (1842–1904)

== S ==
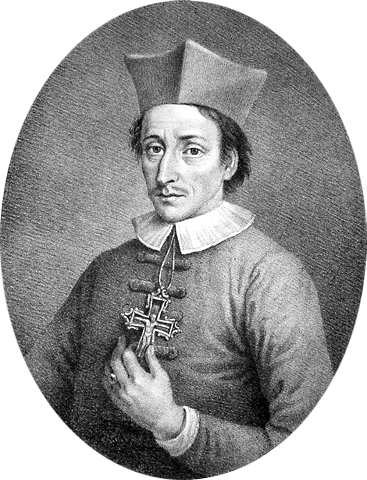
Niels Stensen (Nicolaus Steno) found the law of constant interfacial angles in crystallography.

- Alexander Sadebeck (1843–1879)
- Naima Sahlbom (1871–1957)
- Waldemar Theodore Schaller (1882–1967)
- Adolf Schenck (1857–1936)
- Ernst Erhard Schmid (1815–1885)
- Hans Schneiderhöhn (1887–1962)
- Frank Charles Schrader (1860–1944)
- Albrecht Schrauf (1837–1897)
- Carl Franz Anton Ritter von Schreibers (1775–1852)
- Alexander von Schrenk (1816–1876)
- Werner Schreyer (1930–2006)
- John Scouler (1804–1871)
- Arthur Edmund Seaman (1858–1937)
- Friedrich Seifert (born 1941)
- Quintino Sella (1827–1884)
- Henri Hureau de Sénarmont (1808–1862)
- Arthur Moritz Schoenflies (1853–1928)
- Werner Schreyer (1930–2006)
- Anton Schrötter von Kristelli (1802–1875)
- Carl Schulz (1851–1944)
- Vasily Severgin (1765–1826)
- Sjur Aasmundsen Sexe (1808–1888)
- Vladimir Shcherbina (1907–1978)
- Shen Kuo (1031–1095)
- Li Shizhen (1518–1593)
- Benjamin Silliman (1779–1864)
- Vittorio Simonelli (1860–1929)
- Edward Sydney Simpson (1875–1939)
- John Sinkankas (1915–2002)
- Hjalmar Sjögren (1856–1922)
- Herbert Smith (1872–1953)
- James Smithson (c. 1765 – 1829)
- Vladimir Stepanovich Sobolev (1908–1982)
- Su Song (1020–1101)
- James Sowerby (1757–1822)
- James De Carle Sowerby (1787–1871)
- Leonard James Spencer (1870–1959)
- Harold Robert Steacy (1923–2012)
- Alfred Wilhelm Stelzner (1840–1895)
- Nicolas Steno (1638–1686)
- Clifford H. Stockwell (1897–1987)
- Karl Hugo Strunz (1910–2006)
- Lars Fredrik Svanberg (1805–1878)
- George Shirley Switzer (1915–2008)

== T ==
- James Tennant (1808–1881)
- James B. Thompson Jr. (1921–2011)
- Thomas Thomson (1773–1852)
- Cecil Edgar Tilley (1894–1973)
- Haldor Topsøe (1842–1935)
- Franz Toula (1845–1920)
- Hermann Traube (1860–1913)
- Gerard Troost (1776–1850)
- Gustav Tschermak (1836–1927)
- Michael Tuomey (1805–1857)
- Francis John Turner (1904–1985)

== U ==
- Johann Christoph Ullmann (1771–1821)

== V ==
- Charles-Louis-Joseph-Xavier de la Vallée-Poussin (1827–1903)
- William Sansom Vaux (1811–1882)
- August Ferdinand von Veltheim (1741–1801)
- Vladimir Vernadsky (1863–1945)
- Johann Karl Wilhelm Voigt (1752–1821)
- Otto Volger (1822–1897)

== W ==
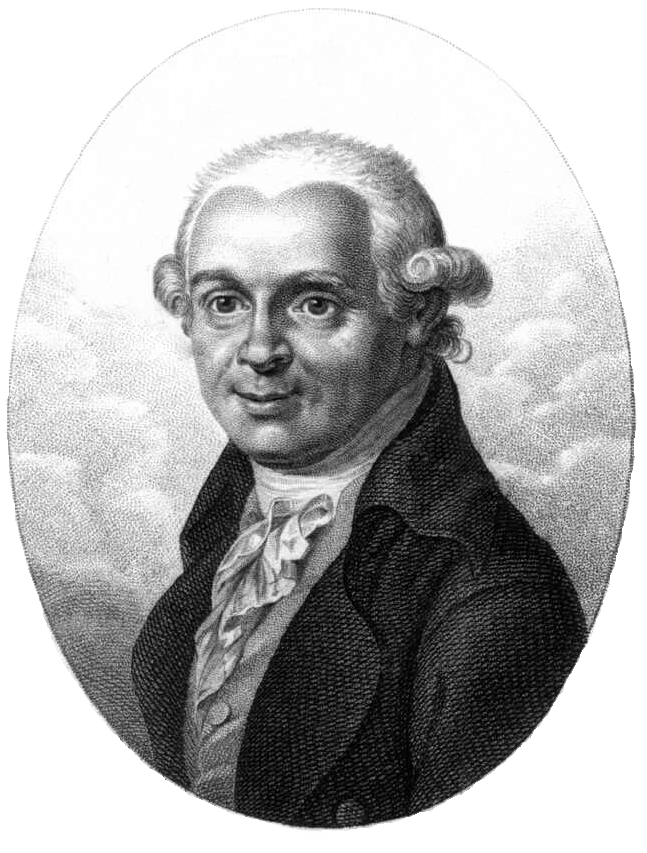
Abraham Gottlob Werner

- Friedrich Walchner (1799–1865)
- John Walker (1730–1803)
- Johan Gottschalk Wallerius (1709–1785)
- Wolfgang Sartorius von Waltershausen (1809–1876)
- Bertram Eugene Warren (1902–1991)
- Alice Mary Dowse Weeks (1909–1988)
- Ernst Weinschenk (1865–1921)
- Christian Ernst Weiss (1833–1890)
- Christian Samuel Weiss (1780–1856)
- Abraham Gottlob Werner (1750–1817)
- Frank T. M. White (1909–1971)
- Carl Ernst Arthur Wichmann (1851–1927)
- William Hyde Wollaston (1766–1828)
- Bernard John Wood (born 19??)
- Peter Woulfe (1727–1803)
- Frederick Eugene Wright (1877–1953)
- Franz Xavier Freiherr von Wulfen (1728–1805)
- Ernst Anton Wülfing (1860–1930)
- Peter John Wyllie (born 1930)

== Y ==
- Hatten Schuyler Yoder, Jr. (1921–2003)
- Philip James Yorke (1799–1874)

== Z ==
- Ferruccio Zambonini (1880–1932)
- Josef Zemann (1923–2022)
- E-An Zen (1928–2014)
- Gustav Anton Zeuner (1828–1907)
- Franz Xaver Zippe (1791–1863)
- Ferdinand Zirkel (1838–1912)
- Sigmund Zois (1747–1819)

== See also ==
- Dana Medal
- List of geologists
- List of geophysicists
- List of minerals named after people
- Roebling Medal
