= Houff =

Houff is a surname. Notable people with the surname include:

- Florens van der Houff (1600–1657), Dutch magistrate and mayor
- Quin Houff (born 1997), American stock car racing driver

== See also ==
- Hoff (surname)
- Huff (surname)
