= Stefan Richarz =

Austrian geologist (1874-1934)

- Born: November 25, 1874; Richrath near Cologne, Germany
- Died: July 13, 1934 (aged 59); Mengyin County, Shandong, China
- Education: University of Vienna; Ludwig-Maximilians-Universität München
- Occupations: Missionary, Geologist
- Scientific career
- Fields: Geology
- Workplaces: Divine Word Missionaries

Stefan Richarz (25 November 1874 – 13 July 1934) was a German priest, missionary and geologist.

Richarz was born in Richrath near Cologne, Germany in 1874. He joined the Divine Word Missionaries in 1893 at Steyl, Netherlands. He studied theology in the school of the order Sankt Gabriel in Maria Enzersdorf near Mödling and received his ordination to the priesthood in 1901. Richarz studied geology, paleontology, petrology and chemistry at the University of Vienna and later mineralogy, philosophy and geology at the Ludwig-Maximilians-Universität München. He received his PhD for work with Ernst Weinschenk and Ernst Freiherr Stromer von Reichenbach in 1919 from the Ludwig-Maximilians-Universität München on basalts from a quarry near Groschlattengrün.

In the following years, he taught geology and astronomy at the school of the order Sankt Gabriel. In 1921, he changed to the school of the Divine Word Missionaries in Techny, Illinois where he lectured on geology, chemistry, mathematics and astronomy. In 1933, Richarz became dean of the science department of the Catholic University of Peking. In his first year, he went on a geological field trip to Mengyin County, Shandong, China, where he died on 13 July 1934.
