= Günther Friedrich =

German mineralogist and professor (1929–2014)

- Born: 15 April 1929; Stuttgart, Germany
- Died: 24 November 2014 (aged 85); Aachen, Germany
- Occupations: Mineralogist; University professor
- Spouse: Helga Friedrich
- Children: Prof. Bernd Friedrich b.1958 Dean of Faculty, Aachen

Günther Friedrich (15 April 1929 – 24 November 2014) was a German mineralogist and university professor at the RWTH University at Aachen. He was an expert in the field of the creation of marine Manganese nodule concretions.

== Life ==
Günther Friedrich was born in Stuttgart, slightly more than six months before the Wall Street crash. He began to study Geology and Mineralogy at his home university in 1948, but by the time he graduated he had transferred to Heidelberg. Here he was supervised for his doctorate by Paul Ramdohr and the geologist Ludwig Rüger. His dissertation was entitled "The Granite Massif of Melibokus (Odenwald) and its rim" ("Das Granitmassiv des Melibokus im Odenwald und seine Randzone"). After this he transferred to the Aachen Technical University (RWTH) where he became an assistant to Doris Schachner at the Study Institute for Mineralogy and Deposits. His habilitation, which followed in 1962, was in the field of Mineralogy and Deposits in the Sierra de Cartagena (Murcia). This was followed by a two-year research visit to North America after which he returned to Aachen to create and head up the Department For Applied Study of Mineral Deposits. In 1975 he succeeded Schachner to the chair of Mineralogy and Deposits and took over as the director of the institute. He remained in post till his retirement in 1994.

== Focus ==
Friedrich was a leafing expert on Polymetallic nodules. With colleagues he undertook several research trips on the RV Sonne devoted to exploration and sample collecting of these sea bottom formations. In 1978 Friedrich was the chief scientist on the research ship's fourth trip of the coast of Peru, and on it sixth trip to the sea area round Hawaii.

== Award ==
In 1995 Friedrich was a recipient of the Abraham Gottlob Werner Medal, awarded by the German Mineralogical Society.
