= Gertrud Woker =

Swiss scientist and suffragette

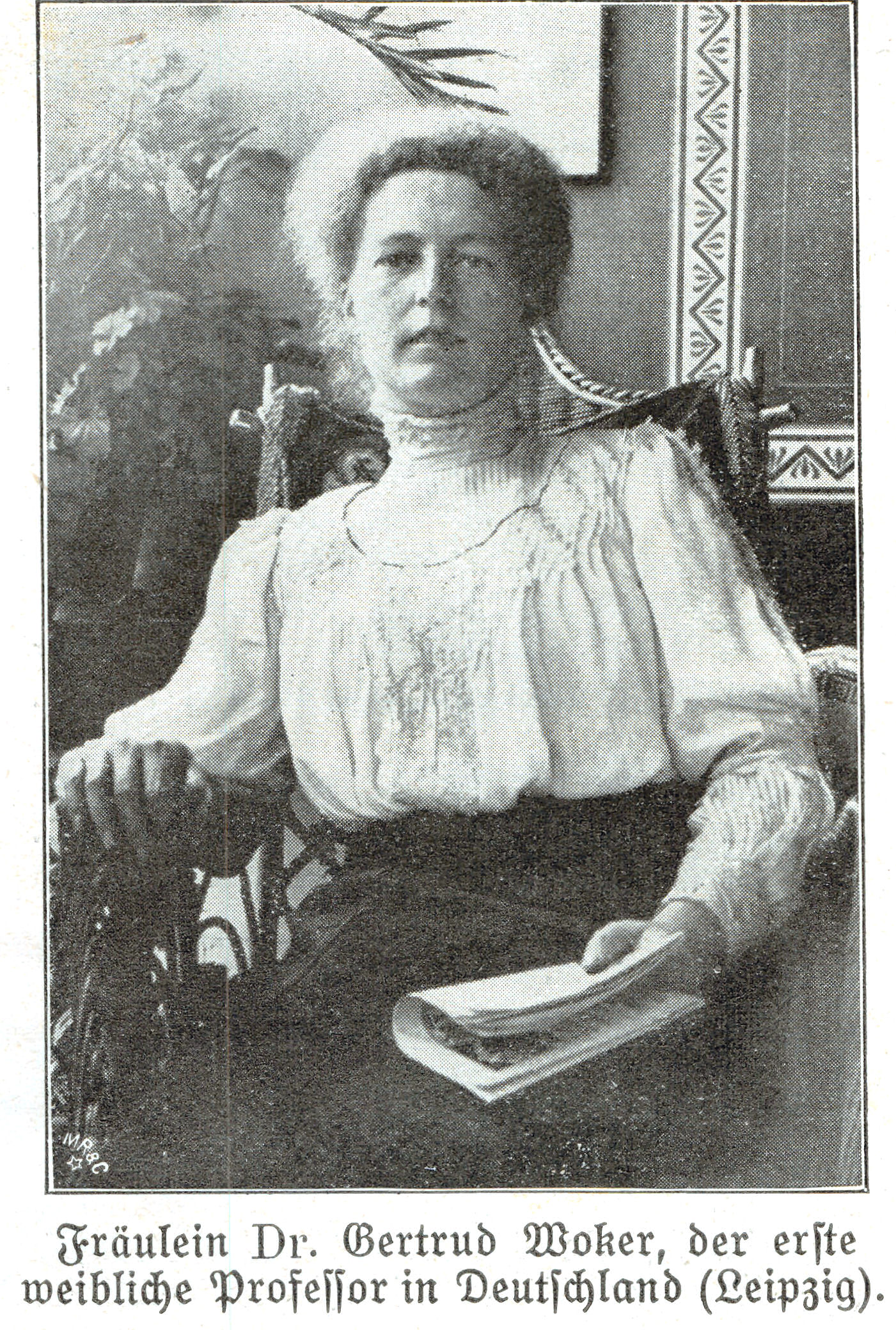
- Born: 16 December 1878
- Died: 13 September 1968 (aged 89)
- Education: University of Berne
- Known for: campaigning against the use of poison gas in warfare.
- Scientific career
- Institutions: University of Berne
- Thesis: Synthesen des 3,4-Dioxyflavons (1903)

Gertrud Johanna Woker (16 December 1878 – 13 September 1968) was a Swiss suffragette, biochemist and toxicologist, and peace activist. She wrote for over twenty years itemizing the dangers of chemical substances on the human body. She campaigned against the use of poison gas in warfare.

== Early life ==
Woker was born on 16 December 1878 to "Old Catholic" theology and history professor Philipp Woker. She came from a well-educated family as besides her father being a professor, her maternal grandfather taught history. Woker was keen to continue her studies but her father sent her to Erfurt to learn to cook. Undeterred, Woker studied mathematics secretly at night with the brother of a fellow student. Leading a double life proved to be an exhausting and Woker fell ill with chlorosis, a form of anaemia.

== Education and career ==
Woker went on to obtain her PhD and school teaching qualification in chemistry, physics and botany from the University of Berne. Upon her graduation in 1903, she was the first Swiss woman to earn a PhD at the University of Berne. Upon her return to Bern, Woker was unable to find a position in her field and became a high school gymnastics teacher. This was short-lived, however, as she then chose to study at Berlin University as a guest, since women were forbidden to be students. She returned home and worked in Konstanecki's laboratory and synthesized a-naphthoflavanol, flavanone, and flavone. By 1907, she held the title of Probleme der katalytischen Forschung at the University of Bern.

She was soon promised an adjunct professorship, which would make her the first woman in Switzerland with that title. However, soon World War 1 struck and the government said that because of financial strain they could not promote her.

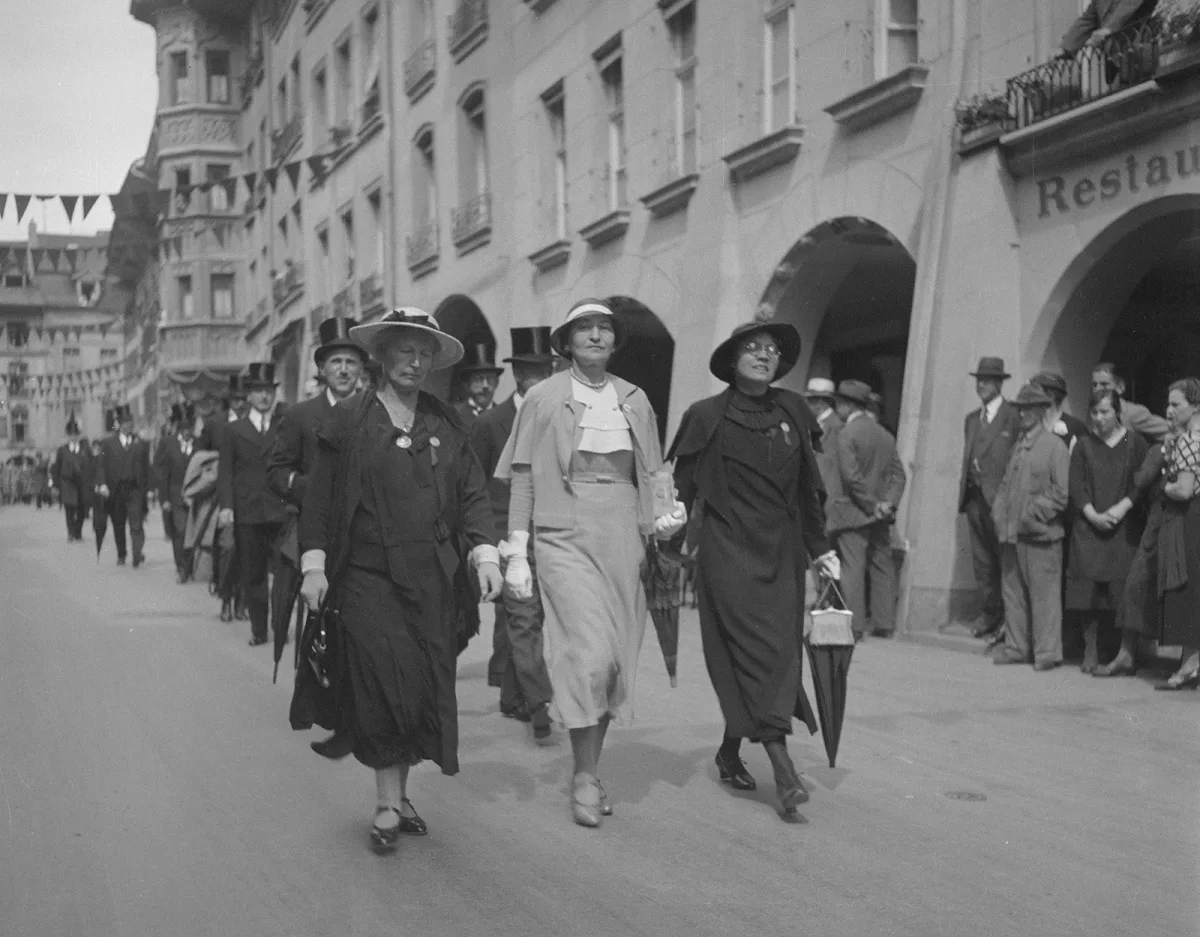
Lecturers Gertrud Woker, Franziska Baumgarten-Tramer, and Marie-Louise Herking (from left), 1934 at the University of Bern 100th Anniversary Parade

Between 1910 and 1931, Woker wrote four volumes of books regarding the dangers of chemical substances on the human body. From 1911 until her retirement, Woker was the head of the physical-chemical biology laboratory at the University of Berne. In her lab, she conducted studies on peroxidase and catalase, detection methods for natural products and in particular color reactions on sterols. However, her main focus of interest was poisonous gas in war. In 1916, Woker was denied the title of professorship again, this time by a tied vote.

In April 1924, Naima Sahlbom and Woker attended the conference of the American Chemical Society in Washington. During a practice of chemical weapons at an arsenal, they surveyed the severity of scientific warfare. Due to a shift in wind, Sahlbom, Woker, and several scientists were exposed to tear gas. In November 1924, the Fourth International Congress of the WILPF convened in Washington, D.C. At the meeting, Ester Akesson-Beskow, Sahlbom, and Woker announced the formation of the Committee Against Scientific Warfare, of which Sahlbom was the chairwoman. In 1925, Woker published "The coming war of Poison Gas" and sent appeals to Women's International League for Peace and Freedom. This was a result of apprehension from parties to appeal the Geneva Convention. She was specifically concerned about the use of mustard gas and the effect it had on the body.

In 1933, she was granted the title of professorship. She retired in 1951 and wrote a two-volume book on the "chemistry of natural alkaloids 1953-1956". She eventually died on 13 September 1968.

== Selected publications ==
The following is a list of selected publications:

- Die Chemie der natürlichen Alkaloide: mit besonderer Berücksichtigung ihrer Biogenese
- Die Katalyse. Die Rolle der Katalyse in der analytischen Chemie
- Der kommende Giftgaskrieg
- Der kommende Gift- und Brandkrieg und seine Auswirkungen gegenüber der Zivilbevölkerung
- Erwerbsarbeit der Frau und Rassenentwicklung
