= Naima Sahlbom =

Swedish chemist, mineralogist and activist (1871 – 1957)

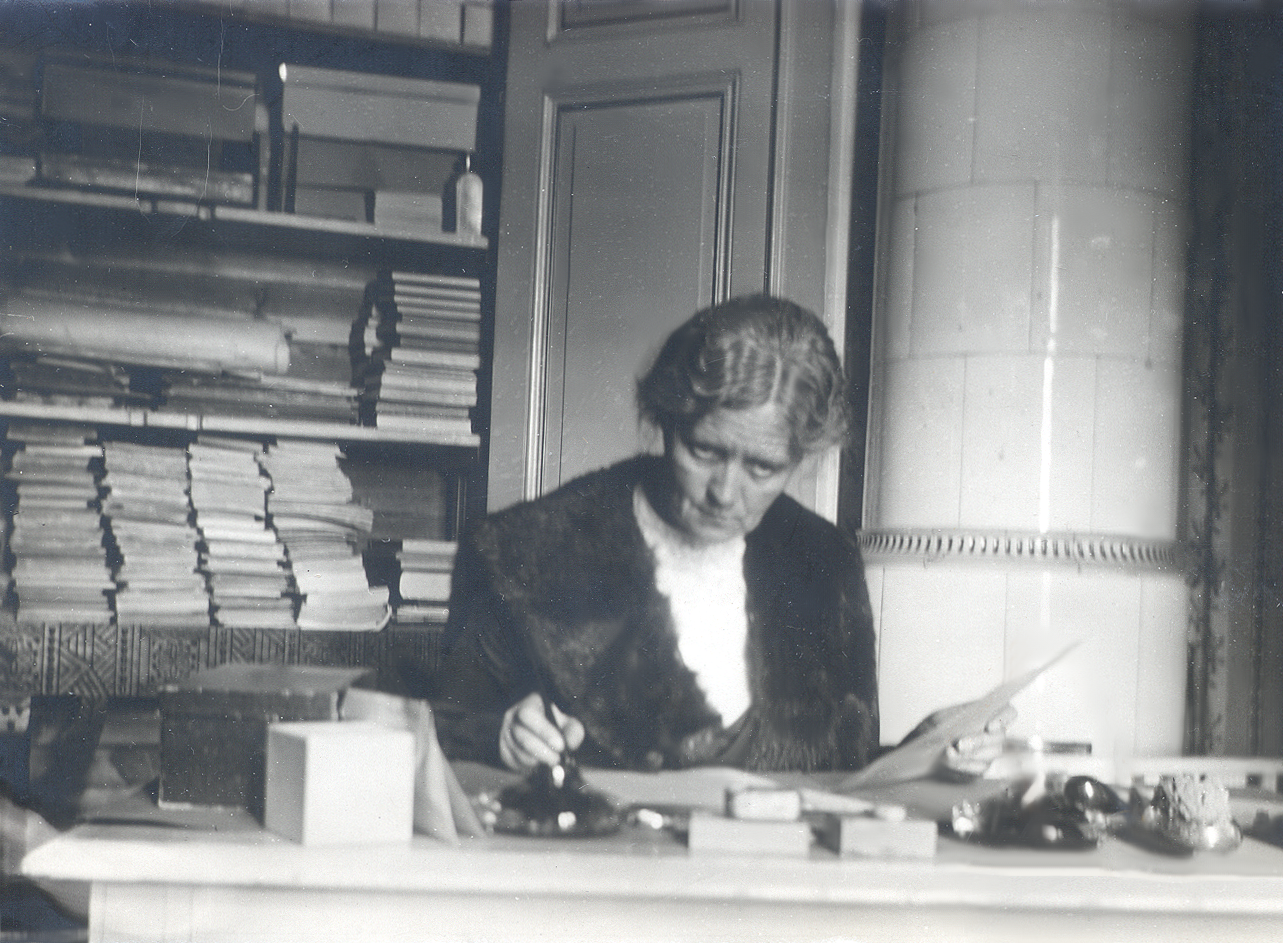
- Born: 15 May 1871; Stockholm
- Died: 29 March 1957 (aged 85); Stockholm
- Education: Uppsala University; University of Neuchâtel
- Awards: Illis Quorum (1946)
- Scientific career
- Fields: Chemistry, mineralogy
- Thesis: Kapillaranalyse kolloider Lösungen (Capillary analysis of colloidal solutions) (1910)
- Doctoral advisor: Friedrich Fichter

Naima Sahlbom (15 May 1871 – 29 March 1957) was a Swedish chemist, mineralogist, and peace activist. She is considered to be one of Sweden's most notable women chemists of the early 20th century.

== Early life and education ==
Sahlbom was born in Stockholm, Sweden, on 15 May 1871. She was the daughter of Charlotte (née Hallin) Sahlbom and Gustav Valfrid Sahlbom, a civil engineer. As a young woman, she attended the Wallinska Girls' School, Sweden's first educational institution to offer university-preparatory education for girls. Scientifically-inclined, Sahlbom was arranged by her father to volunteer at Stockholm Water's laboratory, and she obtained her primary lab experience. In 1893, Sahlbom passed her matriculation examinations and attended Stockholm högskola (now Stockholm University), where she gained experience in the analysis of minerals. Nominated by Helge Bäckström, Sahlbom was inducted as a member of the Geological Society of Stockholm on 10 May 1894. In 1894, she attended Uppsala University, majoring in geology and graduating in 1896.

== Scientific research ==
In 1897, Sahlbom published her first scholarly paper, and the findings detailed a mineral analysis of rocks collected on the island of Alnön. In 1900, Johan Gunnar Andersson of Uppsala University and Sahlbom published a collaborated study on the fluoride content in Swedish phosphorites. The paper noted a similarity in the chemical composition of fluorapatite mineral between two marine invertebrates: the Obolid brachiopod fossil and the Lingula anatina. For financial purposes, Sahlbom declined a research opportunity from Arvid Högbom of Uppsala University and accepted a job offer by John Landin to work at a chemical engineering company in Stockholm. Subsequently, from 1902 to 1903, she was employed at the Geological Survey of Finland in Helsinki, where she was the first woman to be initiated in the Finnish Chemical Society. Due to her association with Hjalmar Sjögren, the former professor of mineralogy and geology at Uppsala University and then director of the mineralogy department at the Swedish Museum of Natural History, Sahlbom extended her experience on mineral analysis by operating at the mineralogy department of the Swedish Museum of Natural History.

During 1903 and 1904, English scientists published research about radioactivity in the scientific journal Nature. In the first 1904 issue, R. J. Strutt identified that radium was detected in the gases of Bath springs. In the next issue, Baron Blythswood and H. S. Allen reported evidence of radioactive gases in Buxton mineral springs. Based on the findings, Sjögren recommended Sahlbom to analyze radioactivity in Swedish waters and referred her to Alexander Classen in Aachen. In 1904, Sahlbom was a pupil of Classen and reviewed radioactive techniques. In 1905, the initial iron springs she tested produced data that deviated, including among adjacent springs. In 1906, advocated by spas, she continued to analyze springs in central and southern Sweden. Her findings demonstrated a lack of correlation between the chemical composition of water resources and radioactivity as well as the depth of wells and radioactivity. A correlation between the geology of water resources and radioactivity was exhibited. Sandstone bedrock in Helsingborg and wells in granite displayed among the highest concentrations of radioactive gases. Sahlbom derived that water resources amassed radioactive gases from flowing through bedrock that contained radium. In 1907, Sahlbom and Sjögren published a paper on 59 springs and wells in Sweden. The paper supported evidence of radioactive emanation in mineral waters.

In the fall of 1907, Sahlbom was admitted to the University of Basel. To proceed with her studies, she declined a research offer from Sjögren. Advised by Friedrich Fichter from the University of Basel, Sahlbom completed her thesis, an investigation on a capillary analysis of colloidal solutions. In 1910, Sahlbom presented the thesis at the University of Neuchâtel, and she earned a doctorate in chemical physics. In 1914, with input from Helge Backlund, Sahlbom set up a laboratory in Stockholm, where she specialized in aqueous mineralogy. A self-employed chemical analyst, Sahlbom was contracted by mineralogists and petrographers for her proficient work. In 1916 she published a second report on mineralogy and radioactivity, with 400 springs and wells analyzed. The paper confirmed that the radioactivity of mineral waters was related to geology. Overall, acid and primary rocks resulted in the most radioactive emanation; mafic and sedimentary rocks demonstrated less radioactivity.

== Activism ==
While studying in Aachen, Basel, and Neuchâtel, Sahlbom supported the women's movement by writing to periodicals in Sweden.

From 1919 to 1944, Sahlbom was a board member of the Internationella Kvinnoförbundet för Fred och Frihet (IKFF), the Swedish division of the Women's International League for Peace and Freedom (WILPF). In April 1924, Sahlbom and Gertrud Woker attended the conference of the American Chemical Society in Washington. During a practice of chemical weapons at an arsenal, they surveyed the severity of scientific warfare. Due to a shift in wind, Sahlbom, Woker, and several scientists were exposed to tear gas. In November 1924, the Fourth International Congress of the WILPF congregated in Washington, D.C. At the meeting, Ester Akesson-Beskow, Sahlbom, and Woker announced the formation of the Committee Against Scientific Warfare, of which Sahlbom was the chairwoman.

In 1925 Sahlbom published an article, titled "Giftgasvapnet" (Poison Gas Weapons) in opposition to the utilization of scientific warfare. She contended that employing scientific research to develop chemical weapons was reductive because war had a significant impact on civilians. The IKFF endorsed Sahlbom's article. In 1929 the IKFF conducted a conference in Frankfurt, where alternative strategies of warfare were discussed. In the 1930s, Greta Engkvist and Sahlbom travelled throughout eastern and southern Europe to advocate the WILPF. Sahlbom was appointed as the section president of Sweden's WILPF in 1935.

For her decades of activism, Sahlbom was bestowed the Illis Quorum medal in 1946, two years after she had resigned as a member of the IKFF.

Sahlbom died at the age of 85 in a Stockholm retirement facility on 29 March 1957.
