= DeHuff =

DeHuff is a surname. Notable people with the surname include:

- Elizabeth Willis DeHuff (1886–1983) American educator, important contributor to the development of Native American easel painting in the 1920s and 1930s.
- Nicole DeHuff (1975–2005) American actress

== See also ==
- Huff (surname)
