= Huff (surname) =

Huff is a surname. Notable people with the surname include:

- Aquilla Huff (1779–?), American who founded Huff Township, Spencer County, Indiana
- Aubrey Huff (born 1976), American baseball player
- Bob Huff (born 1953), American politician
- Braden Huff (born 2005), American basketball player
- Brent Huff (born 1961), American actor, writer and film director
- Bryce Huff (born 1997), American football player
- Daniel W. Huff (1854–1940), American politician
- Dann Huff (born 1960), singer, guitarist, songwriter and producer, and foundation member of 80s hard rock band Giant
- Darrell Huff (1913–2001), economist and author of How to Lie with Statistics
- David Huff (musician), drummer (born 1961), songwriter and record producer, and foundation member of Giant along with brother Dann
- David Huff (baseball) (born 1984), American former Major League Baseball player
- Douglas Huff (1931–1988), American politician
- Gail Huff, reporter for Boston's WCBV-TV, and wife of U.S. Senator Scott Brown
- Gene Huff (1929–2011), American politician
- George Huff (coach) (1872–1936), American athlete and coach; manager of the Boston Red Sox
- George Huff (singer) (born 1980), American singer
- Glen A. Huff (born 1951), judge of the Virginia Court of Appeals
- Janice Huff (born 1960), meteorologist and TV anchor person
- Jay Huff (born 1998), American basketball player
- Josh Huff (born 1991), American football player
- Leon Huff (born 1942), Afro-American songwriter and record producer with Kenneth Gamble as Gamble and Huff
- Michael Huff (born 1983), American football player
- Nicole Huff (born 1998), Canadian actress
- Orlando Huff (born 1978), American football player
- Paul B. Huff (1918–1994), Medal of Honor recipient
- Sadie Robertson Huff, actress and Christian speaker
- Sam Huff (1934–2021), aka Robert Lee Huff, American football player, coach and commentator
- Sam Huff (baseball) (born 1998), American baseball player
- Tanya Huff (born 1957), Canadian fantasy author
- Tom Huff (American politician), American state legislator
- Warren D. Huff, professor of geology at the University of Cincinnati

== See also ==
- DeHuff
