= Schreyerite =

General
- Category: Oxide mineral
- Formula: V_{2}Ti_{3}O_{9}
- IMA symbol: Sry
- Strunz classification: 4.CB.35
- Crystal system: Monoclinic
- Crystal class: Prismatic (2/m) (same H-M symbol)
- Space group: C2/c
- Unit cell: a = 7.06 Å, b = 5.01 Å c = 18.74 Å; β = 119.4°; Z = 4

Identification
- Color: Reddish brown; gray in reflected light
- Crystal habit: As lamellae and microscopic grains, exsolved within rutile crystals
- Twinning: Polysynthetic, universal
- Mohs scale hardness: 7
- Luster: Metallic
- Diaphaneity: Opaque
- Optical properties: Biaxial
- Refractive index: n = 2.700
- Pleochroism: Weak; yellow-brown to reddish brown

Schreyerite (V_{2}Ti_{3}O_{9}), is a vanadium, titanium oxide mineral found in the Lasamba Hill, Kwale district in Coast Province, Kenya. It is polymorphous with kyzylkumite.

The mineral occurs as exsolution lamellae and particles in rutile, coexisting with kyanite, sillimanite, and tourmaline in a highly metamorphosed gneiss. It was named after German mineralogist and petrologist Werner Schreyer, for his research on mineralogy of rock-forming minerals and petrology of metamorphic rocks both in nature and by experiment.

== Introduction ==
Investigation of deposits of green vanadium-bearing kornerupine, revealed the presence of a new vanadium mineral through observations in reflected light. Schreyerite was first discovered in the Kwale district, Kenya. Polymorphous with kyzylkumite, it occurs in highly twinned unmixed grains in vanadium-bearing rutile that occurs as idiomorphic crystals in kornerupine-bearing quartz-biotite-sillimanite gneiss. It also occurs in a pyrite deposit at Sartra, Sweden, in a Pb-Zn ore deposit at Rampura Agucha, India, and recently in metamorphic rocks of the Ol’khon complex on the western shore of Lake Baikal, Russia. Instead of the usual intergrowths with rutile, single crystals of schreyerite were found, associated with titanite.

== Optical and physical properties ==
Schreyerite is a reddish-brown, opaque mineral with metallic luster. Its reflectivity is slightly lower than rutile, and as a result, it is mostly gray. Pleochroism is weak: yellowish brown to reddish brown. When immersed in oil, the contrasts between rutile and schreyerite become clearer, and the color becomes more intense.

With crossed polarizers, moderate anisotropism becomes evident, so that the very fine lamellar twinning becomes distinct. It has hardness of 7 and calculated specific gravity of 4.46.
