= Friedrich Klockmann =

German geologist and mineralogist (1858–1937)

Friedrich Klockmann (12 April 1858, Schwerin – 17 November 1937, Aachen) was a German geologist and mineralogist.

He studied geology and mineralogy at the Bergakademie in Clausthal and at the University of Rostock, receiving his doctorate in 1881. Following graduation he worked for the Prussian Geological Survey, based in Berlin. From 1887 he taught classes in mineralogy and geology at the academy in Clausthal, and in 1892 attained the title of professor. From 1899 he worked as a professor at the technical university in Aachen, where in 1917/18 he served as academic rector.

He was the author of a well-received textbook on mineralogy, "Lehrbuch der Mineralogie", that was published over numerous editions. From the 11th edition (1936) onward, publication of the textbook was continued by Paul Ramdohr. The mineral klockmannite commemorates his name, as does "Klockmannfjellet", a mountain (939m) located in the central part of Wedel Jarlsberg Land, Spitsbergen.

== Selected works ==
- Beitrag zur Kenntniss der granitischen Gesteine des Riesengebirges, 1882 – Contribution to the knowledge of granitic rocks of the Riesengebirge.
- Lehrbuch der Mineralogie, (1897, 15th edition in 1967 by Paul Ramdohr; Karl Hugo Strunz) – Textbook of mineralogy.
