= Christian Ernst Weiss =

German mineralogist, geologist and palaeontologist

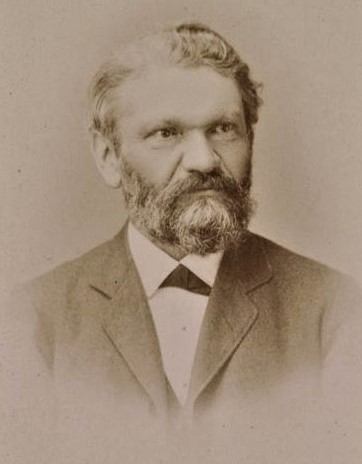
Weiss (circa 1884)

Christian Ernst Weiss (12 May 1833, in Eilenburg – 4 July 1890, in Schkeuditz) was a German mineralogist, geologist and palaeontologist. He is not to be confused with the historian Christian Ernst Weiße (1766–1832).

== Works ==
- Ueber die krystallographische Entwicklung des Quarzsystems und über krystallographische Entwicklungen im Allgemeinen, Phil. Diss., H. W. Schmidt, Halle (Saale) 1859
- Die Mineralien der Freiberger Erzgänge: E. Weiss. Bevorwortet und mit Bemerkungen versehen von B. von Cotta, 1860
- Über Voltzia und andere Pflanzen des bunten Sandsteins zwischen der untern Saar und dem Rheine. Neues Jahrbuch für Mineralogie, Geologie und Palaeontologie, Jahrgang 1864, 279 – 294, Tafel V, Stuttgart 1864
- Beiträge zur Kenntniss der Feldspathbildung und Anwendung auf die Entstehung von Quarztrachyt und Quarzporphyr, 1866
- Begleitworte zur geognostischen Uebersichtskarte des kohlenführenden Saar-Rhein-Gebietes, 1868
- Gliederung der Trias im Saarbrückenschen. Neues Jahrbuch für Mineralogie, Geologie und Palaeontologie, Jahrgang 1869, 215 – 219, Stuttgart 1869
- Fossile Flora der jüngsten Steinkohlenformation und des Rothliegenden im Saar-Rhein-Gebiete: Nebst 20 Tafeln und Textfiguren, 1869
- Über Anomopteris Mougeoti. Neues Jahrbuch für Mineralogie, Geologie und Palaeontologie, Jahrgang 1871, 363 – 368, Stuttgart 1871
- Das Vorkommen kleiner Schalenreste aus dem unteren Buntsandstein von Dürrenberg, Provinz Sachsen. Zeitschrift der Deutschen Geologischen Gesellschaft, XXVII, 710–712, Berlin 1875
- Steinkohlen-Calamarien: mit besonderer Berücksichtigung ihrer Fructificationen, Neumann, 1876
- Ueber die Entwicklung der fossilen Floren in den geologischen Perioden, 1878
- Atlas von 3 lithographischen Tafeln zur Abhandlung über die Flora des Rothliegenden von Wünschendorf bei Lauban in Schlesien, 1879
- Die Krystallisationsgesetze seit Ch. S. Weiß, insbesondere die Lehre von der Hemiëdrie, erörtert am Diamant, 1880
- Ueber die vertikale Verbreitung der Steinkohlenpflanzen, 1881
- Die Steinkohlen-führenden Schichten bei Ballenstedt am nördlichen Harzrande, A. W. Schade's Buchdruckerei, 1882
- Ueber einige Pflanzenreste aus der Rubengrube bei Neurode in Nieder-Schliesen, 1884
- Zur Flora der ältesten Schichten des Harzes, 1884
- Petrographische Beiträge aus dem nördlichen Thüringer Walde, 1884
- Über eine Buntsandstein-Sigillaria und deren nächste Verwandte. Jahrbuch der Königlich Preussischen geologischen Landesanstalt und Bergakademie zu Berlin für das Jahr 1885, 356 – 361, Berlin 1886
- Die Sigillarien der preussischen Steinkohlengebiete. – I. Die Gruppe der Favularien, Simon Schropp'sche Hof-Landkartenhandlung (J. H. Neumann), Berlin 1887, Digitalisiert
- Beiträge zur fossilen Flora I–IV, 1888
