= Paula Hahn-Weinheimer =

German university teacher (1917-2002)

Paula Hahn-Weinheimer (1917 – 2002) was a German geochemist.

== Education and early career ==
Paula Hahn-Weinheimer studied chemical engineering in Nuremberg and subsequently worked as a chemist for different companies. In 1943 she completed her studies at the Goethe University Frankfurt by obtaining a D.Sc. in organic chemistry. She then worked at the University of Giessen’s Institute for Organic Chemistry as well as at the Goethe University Frankfurt. As of 1948 she worked as a research assistant and lecturer at the Goethe University Frankfurt’s Department of Mineralogy where she obtained her official German postdoctoral qualification in geochemistry in 1958.

== Professorship ==
In 1964, Paula Hahn-Weinheimer accepted a post at the Technical University of Munich (formerly known as THM) where she was head of research for geochemistry at the Department of Mineralogy, initially as a scientific associate and, as of 1970, as TUM’s first female associate professor (C3) in the field of natural sciences. Liesel Beckmann had become the first female associate professor in the field of business economics in 1946.

== Research interests ==
Her research areas ranged from the investigation into magmatic and metamorphic rocks in order to clarify their genesis and age to the determination of the origin of graphite and various types of petroleum. Research and scientific education was very important to her. Hence she managed to establish comprehensive chemical analyses of trace elements and isotopes by raising extensive third-party funds from the industry and federal government as well as through a partnership with the Department of Radiochemistry in Garching. She has made a lasting contribution by further developing the analysis of X-ray fluorescence and its application in geochemistry. Due to her expertise in this field she was invited to spend sabbatical leaves at international institutions including the University of Oxford and the University of Cape Town as well as the NASA Goddard Space Flight Center. In addition to the analysis of X-ray fluorescence, the excellent technical equipment of her department facilitated further analyses to determine elements and trace elements such as atomic absorption, mass spectrometry, optical emissions analysis, X-ray diffractometry, neutron activation analysis and the determination of isotopic abundance. A number of students took their doctorate under Paula Hahn-Weinheimer. One of her last students, Alfred V. Hirner (a post-doctoral student at the time), was her interim successor at the TUM and later initiated the field of analytical chemistry at the University of Duisburg-Essen (1991).

== Publications and advocacy ==
Paula Hahn-Weinheimer is the author of more than 50 scientific publications.

She was repeatedly featured in studies and exhibitions on the history of university education for women, especially with regard to the role women have played at technical universities in general and at the Technical University of Munich in particular.
