= Konrad Oebbeke =

German geologist and mineralogist (1853–1932)

Konrad Oebbeke (2 November 1853, Hildesheim – 1 February 1932) was a German geologist and mineralogist.

He studied at Heidelberg University and the University of Erlangen, obtaining his doctorate at the University of Würzburg in 1877. Afterwards he worked as an assistant to the Geological Survey of Bavaria. He served as privat-docent at the Ludwig-Maximilians-Universität München, later becoming a professor of mineralogy and geology at the University of Erlangen (1887). From 1895 to 1927, he was a professor at the Technische Hochschule München.

Oebekke is known for his studies of minerals found in Bavaria, in particular those of economic value. In the Fichtel Mountains he drew attention to the presence of well-crystallized minerals (including topaz) on Epprechtstein. He produced several editions of Wolfgang Franz von Kobell's "Tafeln zur Bestimmung der Mineralien" (Tables for the determination of minerals), and with Ernst Weinschenk (1865-1921), he published editions 6 & 7 of Kobell's "Lehrbuch Der Mineralogie". Other written works by Oebbeke include.

- Ein Beitrag zur Kenntniss der Palaeopikrits und seiner Umwandlungsproducte, 1877 - Contribution to the study of paleopicrites, etc.
- Beiträge zur Petrographie der Philippinen und der Palau-Inseln, 1881 - Contributions to the petrography of the Philippines and Palau Islands. (habilitation thesis)
- Die Stellung der Mineralogie und Geologie an den technischen Hochschulen. Festrede gehalten zur Eröffnungsfeier des Studienjahres am 10. Dezember 1902 - Regarding mineralogy and geology curriculum at technical universities: Opening ceremony speech held for the academic year on December 10, 1902.
- Die Braunkohlenvorkommen Bayerns, 1907 - Lignite deposits in Bavaria.
- Gutachten über ein Vorkommen von kristallinem Magnesit im Kronlande Salzburg, 1912 - Report on an occurrence of crystalline magnesite in the Kronland Salzburg, 1912.
