= Karl Cäsar von Leonhard =

German geologist and assessor (1779–1862)

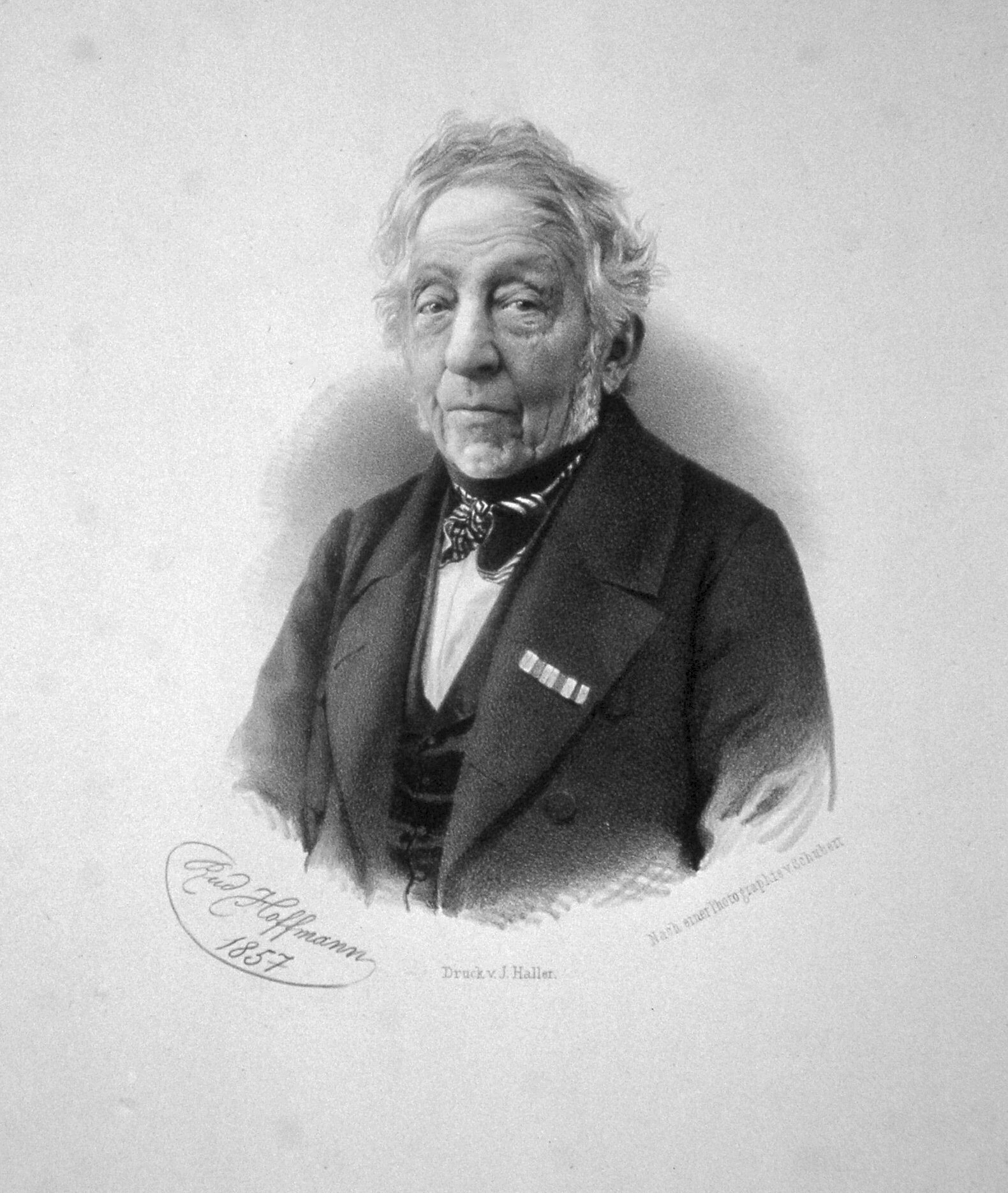
- 1857 lithograph
- Born: 12 September 1779; Rumpenheim, Germany
- Died: 23 January 1862 (aged 82); Heidelberg, Germany
- Occupations: Mineralogist and geologist
- Children: Gustav von Leonhard

Signature
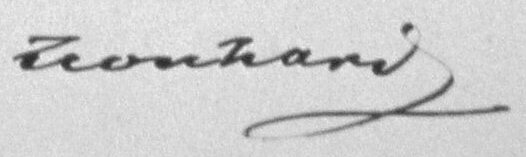

Karl Cäsar von Leonhard (12 September 1779 – 23 January 1862) was a German mineralogist and geologist. His son, Gustav von Leonhard, was also a mineralogist.

From 1797 he studied at the universities of Marburg and Göttingen, where Johann Friedrich Blumenbach was an important influence to his career. He collected many mineralogical specimens on scientific excursions in Saxony and Thuringia, continued by travel to the Austrian Alps (including the Salzkammergut). During his journeys he made the acquaintance of Friedrich Mohs and Karl von Moll. In 1818, through assistance from Baden minister of state Sigismund von Reitzenstein, he was appointed professor of mineralogy at the University of Heidelberg.

In 1807 he founded the popular mineralogical journal "Taschenbuch für die gesammte Mineralogie" — after 1830 the publication was known as "Neues Jahrbuch für Mineralogie, Geologie and Paläontologie" (edited with Heinrich Georg Bronn).

He was a founding member of the Wetterauischen Gesellschaft (Wetterau Society). During his career, he maintained correspondence on mineralogical subjects with Leopold von Buch, Johann Wolfgang von Goethe, Abraham Gottlob Werner and Johann Karl Wilhelm Voigt.

In 1824 he introduced the term "loess" into the geological science. Nowadays Leonhard is recognized as one of the key pioneers of loess studies The term "leonhardite" bears his name, being defined as a partially dehydrated, opaque laumontite.

== Selected works ==
- Systematisch-tabellarische Uebersicht und Charakteristik der Mineralkörper, 1806 (with Johann Heinrich Kopp and Karl Friedrich Merz) – Systematic tabular overview and characteristics of the mineral body.
- Bedeutung und Stand der Mineralogie, 1816 – The importance and state of mineralogy.
- Mineralogisch-chemische Untersuchungen des Triphan's und Tantalit's, 1818 – Mineralogical-chemical studies of triphane and tantalite.
- Handbuch der Oryktognosie, 1821 – Handbook of mineralogy.
- Charakteristik der Felsarten, 1824 – a catalogue of ground materials.
- Die Basalt-Gebilde in ihren Beziehungen zu normalen und abnormen Felsmassen, 1832 – Basalt formations in their relationship to normal and abnormal masses of rock.
- Naturgeschichte des Mineralreichs (2 volumes, 1833) – Natural history of the mineral kingdom.
- Lehrbuch der Geognosie und Geologie, 1835 – Textbook of geognosy and geology.
- Geologie, oder Naturgeschichte der Erde (5 volumes, 1836) – Geology; natural history of the Earth.
- Agenda geognostica; Hülfsbuch für reisende Gebirgsforscher und Leitfaden zu Vorträgen über angewandte Geognosie, 1838 – Geognostic agenda; hülfsbuch for mountain researchers and a guide to lectures on applied geology.
