= Peggy-Kay Hamilton =

American mineralogist (1922–1959)

- Born: 1922; Illinois, U.S.
- Died: September 19, 1959 (aged 36–37)
- Education: University of Columbia
- Occupation: Researcher

Peggy-Kay Hamilton (1922–1959) was born in Illinois in 1922 and was an American Research Associate in Mineralogy in the Department of Geology at Columbia University. One of Hamilton's first research breakthroughs was developing Research Project 49, otherwise known as the study of clay minerals. In her later research years, her focus shifted and led to her becoming involved full time in the study of uranium.

Hamilton achieved success in the fields of geology and mineralogy; according to her frequent research partner and friend Paul F. Kerr, Hamilton was held in high regard by both students at Columbia University as well as professional colleagues at multiple scientific research institutions.

Hamilton was a member of the international non-profit honour society known as Sigma Xi as well as of the Mineralogical Society of Canada. In 1957 Hamilton was elected as a fellow in the Mineralogical Society of America and the following year also elected as a fellow to the Geological Society of America.

== Education ==
After graduating from Vassar College in 1944, Hamilton went on to study mineralogy and geology at Columbia University. She successfully completed a Master’s degree at Columbia in 1947. Although Hamilton did not complete a doctoral degree, she completed the research and publication equivalents of several doctorate degrees. Throughout her career, Hamilton was well known for her work as a Research Associate in Columbia University’s Department of Geology.

== Career ==
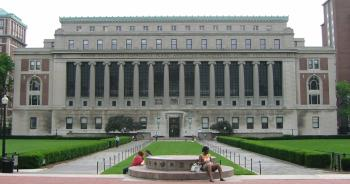
Photo of Columbia University Campus in New York City, taken on Sunday, June 15, 2003. Hamilton's alma mater, where she obtained her masters and lifelong career as a research associate.

After earning a Master's degree, Hamilton worked at Columbia University’s Mineralogy Department of Geology where she became an American Research Associate. During this time, Hamilton focused her studies on the differentiation of clay mineral types and produced many successful publications, along with her fellow Research Associate, Kerr.

One of Hamilton's first breakthroughs was her publication of Research Project 49 on behalf of the American Petroleum Institute, where she contributed significantly to the glossary of clay minerals that the Institute published. Hamilton also contributed to optical X-Ray studies conducted by the American Petroleum Institute and was a major editor in these publications.

Soon after, Hamilton became dedicated to discerning the origin and nature of uranium. Her work on uranium was published multiple times by the Division of Raw Materials of the Atomic Energy Commission. It was also published in the American Mineralogist and the Bulletin of the Geological Society of America. Hamilton’s project to classify uranium led to her major discoveries of umohoite and chrome mica-clay. Throughout this research, Hamilton also found radioactive blue-black soot masses and carbonaceous trash in Cameron, Arizona.

While analyzing umohoite, Hamilton noticed that any fresh surface of the mineral developed a bright blue powder-like substance. She later determined this substance to be molybdenum efflorescence, which forms a few days after the mineral has been exposed to the atmosphere. With the use of X-Ray spectroscopy, uranium was indeed discovered in the mineral, as well as silica, sulphur, iron, cobalt, nickel, arsenic and thallium. After conducting sample collections in various parts of the world, it was discovered that this mineral is far more diverse and distributed than originally thought.

== Legacy ==
Hamilton spent her time at Columbia University devoted to research. Hamilton's early publications from 1949-1950 focus on her assistance with Project 49: a crucial research effort by the American Petroleum Institute. This research project supported the publication of Glossary of Clay Mineral Names: American Petroleum Institute, Project 49, Clay Mineral standards.

As mineralogy became increasingly interested in uranium research during the 1950s, Hamilton pursued full-time research regarding the identification and nature of uranium minerals. Under the Atomic Energy Commission, Hamilton investigated and published reports for the prospect of and empirical occurrence of uranium in United States based mines.

Hamilton utilized X-ray spectroscopy to discover the widespread nature of uranium through studying substances such as umohoite and chrome mica-clay.

Despite offers for higher-paying jobs outside of New York, Hamiltons devotion for her family caused her to continue her research at Columbia University until her death at age 37. She was remembered by colleagues as "a friend, a research advisor, and a constant source of professional information on the solution of mineralogical problems."

Peggy-Kay Hamilton's contribution towards the science of mineralogy pertaining to clay and uranium minerals was briefly acknowledged on page 61 of Deborah Nash's book Woman in Science: Righting the Record.

== Publications ==
- Kerr, Paul F., and Peggy Kay. Hamilton. Glossary of Clay Mineral Names. New York : Columbia University, 1949 : [Ann Arbor, Mich. : University Microfilms International, 1978. Print. American Petroleum Institute. Clay Mineral Standards. Preliminary Report; No. 1.

Hamilton classified various clay minerals, which led to this publication by American Petroleum Institute’s research project 49. The publication itself is a comprehensive list of notes for readers who do not have geology backgrounds that help make sense of the observed properties or characteristics.

The following 3 studies were a part of the United States Atomic Energy Commission's Annual Report for July 1, 1950, to June 30, 1951:

1. Preliminary Memorandum Marysvale, Utah (1951)- Visiting five previously discovered mines in Marysvale, Utah with uranium mineralization, Paul F. Kerr, T.P. Anderson, P.K. Hamilton, and R.J. Pill found evidence of uranium mineralization in the form of uranite in the lowest level of rock which disproved previous studies which claimed that oxidized uranium minerals would not be found in lower layers of rock.
2. Uranium in Black King Prospect, Placerville, Colorado (1951)- Throughout the Black King Prospect located outside of Placerville, Colorado, fissures resulting from fault movements were found to be saturated with radioactive organic material. Uranium was found to be spreading through hydrocarbons, leading to the conclusion that hydrothermal activity is a cause of mineralization.
3. Bellevue - Rochester Mine (1951) - While analyzing a mine site near Colorado Springs, Idaho, Hamilton and her colleagues Kerr and Anderson observed a close association between a clay-bearing area and a radioactive seam, and proposed a hydrothermal origin for both. Their research also found evidence of apatite, biotite, residual quartz, chlorite, kaolinite, pyrite, sooty uraninite, and various carbonates.
- Kerr, Paul Francis, and Hamilton, Peggy-Kay. "Chrome Mica-clay, Temple Mountain, Utah." The American Mineralogist 43.1-2 (1958): 34-47. Web.

While examining chrome mica-clay and its conditions of formation as well as its associated polymorphs, Hamilton and Kerr’s suggested a relationship between hydrothermal chromium-bearing solutions and mica-clay. The two concluded that chrome mica-clay occurs at Temple Mountain, Utah, in association with uranium mineralization. At the time, this was the second confirmed site of uranium mineralization in the United States. This research furthered Hamilton and Kerr’s hypothesis that uranium is far more widespread than previously believed.

- Hamilton, Peggy-Kay, and Kerr, Paul Francis. "Umohoite from Cameron, Arizona." The American Mineralogist 44.11-12 (1959): 1248-260. Web.

This study confirmed the presence of fine-grained umohoite in Cameron, Arizona as the third locale for umohoite in the United States. With this discovery and the confirmation of umohoite found in the U.S.S.R, Hamilton and Kerr concluded that the rare mineral "is more widespread in occurrence than was known previously, and the fine-grained form may be considerably more abundant than is now known.

== Death ==
On September 19, 1959, at the age of 37, Hamilton died at the Lawrence Hospital in Bronxville, New York. Hamilton died following a short, sudden illness and a cerebral operation for cancer.
