= Gustav von Leonhard =

German mineralogist and geologist (1816–1878)

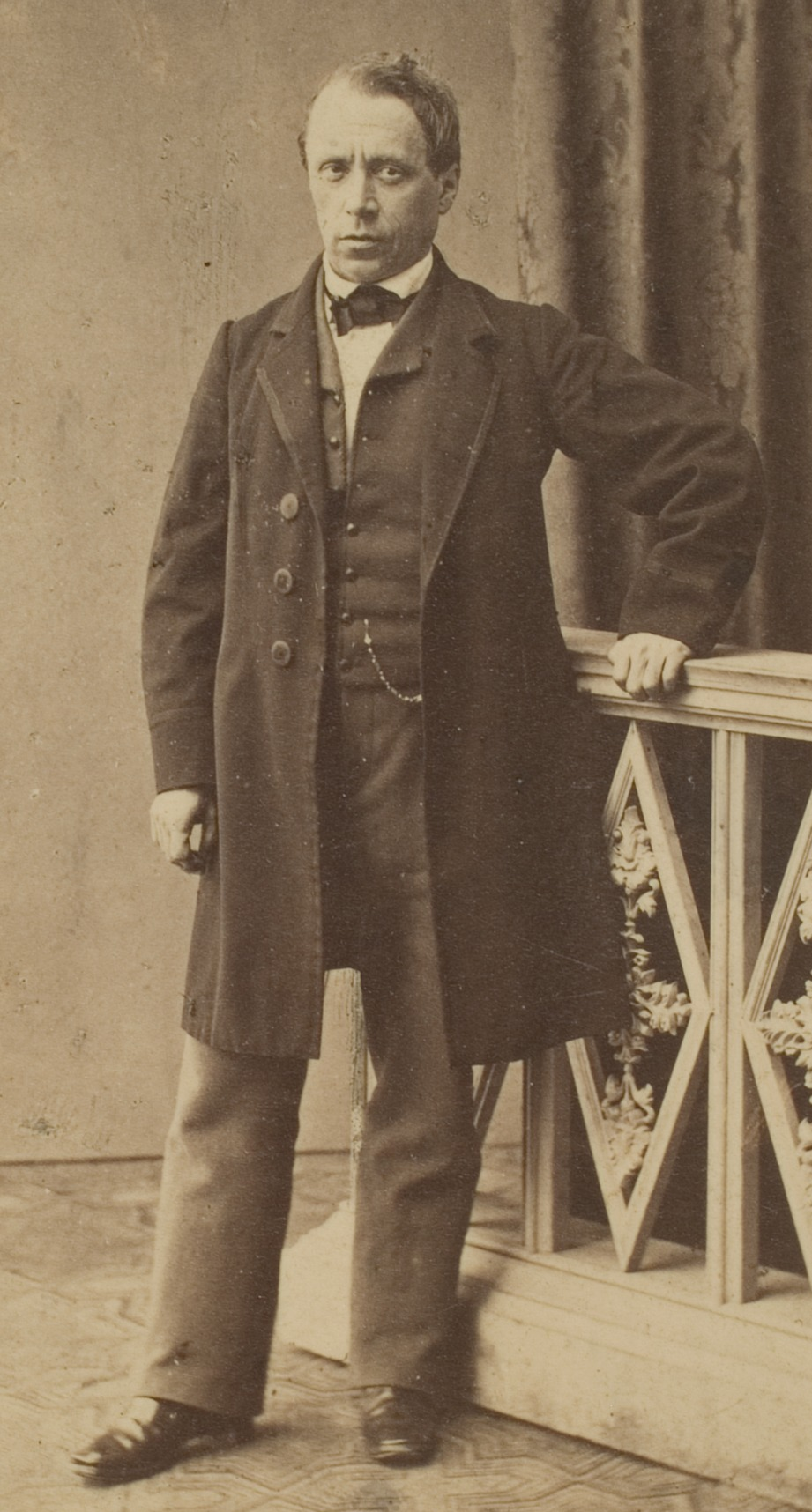
Gustav von Leonhard

Gustav von Leonhard (12 November 1816 in Munich – 27 December 1878 in Heidelberg) was a German mineralogist and geologist. He was the son of mineralogist Karl Cäsar von Leonhard.

He studied mineralogy and related sciences at the University of Heidelberg, receiving his doctorate in 1840. He continued his education in Berlin, and in 1841 obtained his habilitation at Heidelberg. In 1853 he became an associate professor of mineralogy at the University of Heidelberg.

From 1862 until his death, he worked as editor, with Hanns Bruno Geinitz, of the "Neues Jahrbuch für Mineralogie, Geologie und Paläontologie", a journal which had been founded by von Leonhard's father.

== Published works ==
- Über einige pseudomorphosirte zeolithische Substanzen aus Rheinbaiern, nebst allgemeinen Bemerkungen diese Gruppe mineralischer Körper betreffend, 1841 – On some pseudomorphic zeolite substances from Rhenish Bavaria.
- Handwörterbuch der topographischen mineralogie, 1843 – Handbook of topographical mineralogy.
- Geognostische skizze des grossherzogthums Baden. Ein leitfaden für vorträge in höheren und mittelschulen jeder art, 1846 – Geognostic sketch of the Grand Duchy of Baden.
- Die Quarz-führenden Porphyre, 1851 – Quartz-porphyry.
- Die Mineralien Badens nach ihrem Vorkommen, 1852 – Mineral spas according to resources.
- Grundzüge der mineralogie, 1860 – Basics of mineralogy.
- Grundzüge der Geognosie und Geologie, 1863 – Basics of geognosy and geology.
- Katechismus der Mineralogie, 1878 – Catechism of mineralogy.
