= Jean de Chastelet =

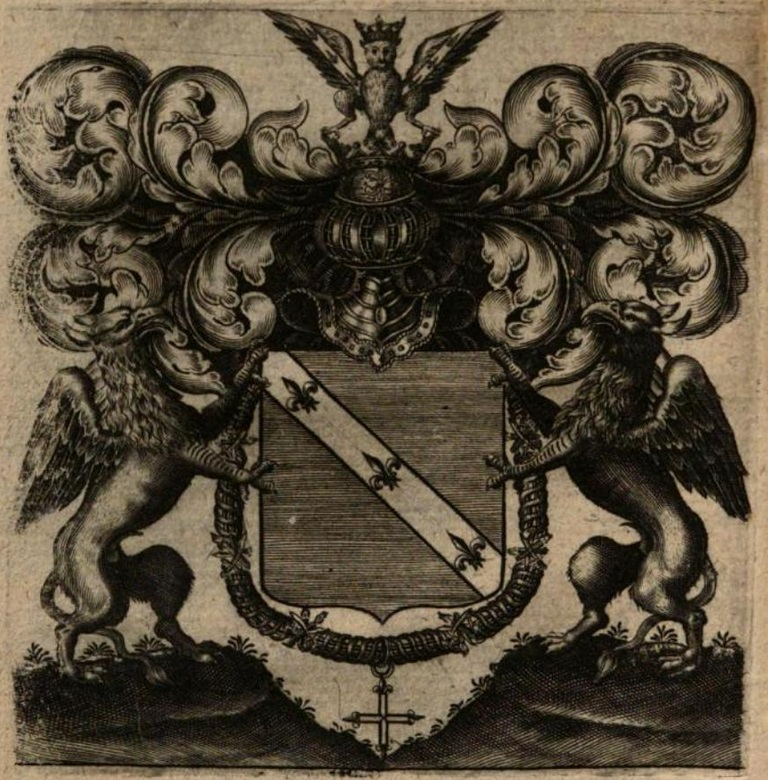
Coat of Arms of the Chatelet/Chastelet family.

Jean du Chatelet, also known as Baron de Beausoleil and Auffembach (1578, Brabant – c. 1645, The Bastille, Paris), was a mineralogist, mining engineer and dowser.

== Life ==
After an early career as a soldier, du Chatelet became enthused with the study of minerals and undertook a tour of Europe visiting mines in Germany, Hungary, Bohemia, Tyrol, Silesia, Moravia, Poland, Sweden, Italy, Spain, Scotland, and England. Through his extensive research he gained an unequaled expertise in mining and minerals. The German emperors Rudolph and Matthias appointed him Commissary General of the Hungarian mines.

In 1610 he married Martine Bertereau, the educated daughter of a noble family of French mine owners who accompanied him on his tours and at his work underground.

The instruments and methods that the couple employed in their mineral exploration have led to his being associated with dowsing, astrology and alchemy.

From around 1600 du Chatelet had undertaken a commission from the King of France to prospect within France and develop mines there. The semi-occult methods he used brought him a brush with the ecclesiastical authorities in 1627 while in Brittany. He and his wife were forced to flee to Germany and lost much of their records and equipment in the process. They returned to France in 1630 to continue their work under a new French King, Louis XIII.

During all his work for the French state, du Chatelet had never received payment and in 1640 in a precarious financial state his wife Martine wrote the Restitution of Pluto a Latin poem asking for payment and sent rather rashly to Cardinal Richelieu. They received no reply but the charges of sorcery were resurrected and they were both imprisoned - he in the Bastille and she in the Castle of Vincennes. Both died in prison, he around 1645 and she in 1642.

== Bibliography ==
- Les Anciens Minéralogistes du royaume de France, Nicolas Godet, Ruault, Paris, 1779
- Biographie universelle ancienne et moderne, Michaud, Paris, 1843
