= Hans Schneiderhöhn =

German geologist and mineralogist (1887–1962)

Hans Schneiderhöhn (2 June 1887 in Mainz – 5 August 1962 in Sölden) was a German geologist and mineralogist who specialized in ore microscopy.

== Biography ==
In 1909 he received his doctorate from the University of Giessen, and two years later began work as an assistant to Theodor Liebisch at the mineralogical-petrographic institute of the University of Berlin. In 1914, on behalf of the Otavi Mining and Railway Company, he traveled to German Southwest Africa, where he spent several years conducting studies on the geology and ore deposits of the Otavi Mountains. In 1919 he obtained his habilitation for mineralogy, petrology and economic geology at the University of Frankfurt. During the following year, he returned to Giessen as an associate professor of mineralogy, and soon afterwards attained a full professorship. Later in his career he served as a professor at the Technische Hochschule in Aachen (from 1924) and at the University of Freiburg (from 1926).

The mineral schneiderhöhnite is named in his honor.

== Selected works ==
- Anleitung zur mikroskopischen bestimmung und untersuchung von erzen und aufbereitungsprodukten besonders im auffallenden licht, 1922 – Instructions for microscopic identification and analysis of ores, etc.
- Lehrbuch der Erzmikroskopie, (with Paul Ramdohr), 1931–34; 2 volumes – Textbook of ore microscopy.
- Erzmikroskopische Bestimmungstafeln : Anhang zum Lehrbuch der Erzmikrospie, 1931.
- Mineralogische bodenschätze im südlichen Afrika, 1931 – Mineral resources of southern Africa.
- Die Erzlagerstätten der Erde, 1933 – The ore deposits of the earth.
- Lehrbuch der Erzlagerstättenkunde, 1941 – Textbook of economic geology in regards to ores.
- Einführung in die Kristallographie, 1949 – Introduction to crystallography.
- Erzmikroskopisches Praktikum, 1952 – Ore microscopy field work.
