= Johann Heinrich Kopp =

German physician and natural scientist

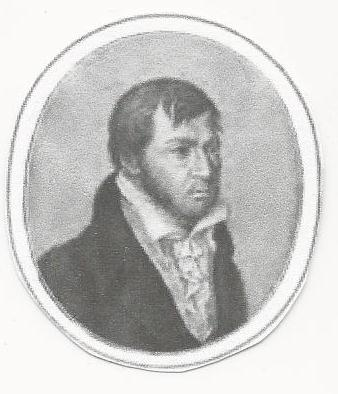
Johann Heinrich Kopp

Johann Heinrich Kopp (17 September 1777, in Hanau – 28 November 1858, in Hanau) was a German medical doctor and natural scientist. He was the father of chemist Hermann Franz Moritz Kopp (1817–1892).

He studied medicine at the universities of Rinteln, Marburg and Jena, obtaining his habilitation in 1801. He briefly worked as a doctor in Rödelheim, then settled as a physician in his hometown of Hanau. From 1807 he served as a professor of chemistry, physics and natural history at the lyceum in Hanau. In 1813 he was appointed a medical officer and in 1815 attained the title of Hofrat (councilor). Later on, he became a personal physician to the Elector of Hesse. In 1808 he was a founding member of the Wetterauische Gesellschaft, serving as its director in 1826/28.

He was the author of writings on various medical subjects; the best regarded were his work in the field of forensic medicine. In 1808 he provided an early description of bieberite, a mineral he referred to as "kobaltvitriol".

== Selected works ==
- Dissertatio inauguralis medica sistens tentamen de causis combustionis spontaneae in corpore humano factae, 1800 (dissertation thesis, Jena).
- Grundriß der chemischen Analyse mineralischer Körper, 1805 – Outline of chemical analysis involving the mineral body.
- Systematisch-tabellarische Uebersicht und Charakteristik der Mineralkörper in oryktognostischer und orologischer Hinsicht, 1806 (with Karl Cäsar von Leonhard; Karl Friedrich Merz) – Systematic tabular overview and characteristics of the mineral body in regards to mineralogy and orology.
- Mineralogische synonymik, 1810 – Mineralogical synonymy.
- Ausführliche Darstellung und Untersuchung der Selbstverbrennungen des menschlichen Körpers in gerichtlich-medizinischer und pathologischer, 1811 – Elaboration and investigation of self-immolation of the human body in forensics and pathology.
- Denkwürdigkeiten in der ärztlichen Praxis (5 volumes 1830–44) – Memoirs of the medical practice.
