= Werner Schreyer =

German mineralogist

Werner Schreyer (14 November 1930 in Nuremberg – 12 February 2006 in Bochum) was a German mineralogist and experimental metamorphic petrologist. Schreyer completed his undergraduate work in geology and petrology at the University of Erlangen–Nuremberg, obtained his doctorate from LMU Munich in 1957, and in 1966 received his Habilitation from Kiel University. He was a professor at Ruhr University Bochum from 1966 to 1996. In 2002, Schreyer became the first German to be awarded the Mineralogical Society of America's highest honor, the Roebling Medal. Schreyer was a leading expert on phase relations in the MgO–Al_{2}O_{3}–SiO_{2}–H_{2}O (MASH) system, specializing in cordierite and minerals with equivalent chemical compositions, and high pressure and ultra high-pressure metamorphic mineral assemblages.

The mineral Schreyerite (V2Ti3O9) was named after Schreyer.
