= Vladimir Shcherbina =

Vladimir Vital'evich Shcherbina (1907–1978) was a prominent Soviet geochemist and mineralogist. He was a student of Alexander Fersman.

In 1931, he led a team from the USSR Academy of Sciences in the mineralogical examination of the Lovozero Massif.

Shcherbinaite, a naturally occurring mineral form of vanadium pentoxide, is named for him.

MAIK Nauka has deemed him an "outstanding" geochemist, and in 1998 sponsored a memorial lecture in his honor.
