= Martine Bertereau =

French scientist

Martine de Bertereau (c. 1590 – after 1642), also known as Baroness de Beausoleil, was a French mineralogist who was the first recorded female mineralogist and mining engineer. She and her husband, Jean de Chastelet, traveled extensively throughout Europe in search of mineral deposits and fresh ground water under the employment of various nobles and royals. During one such mining expedition, which saw Martine and Jean surveying potential mine sites in France for Louis XIII, the family were accused of witchcraft and forced to flee to Hungary. Later, Martine, Jean, and their oldest daughter were arrested, and eventually died in prison sometime after 1642. During her lifetime, Martine produced multiple pieces of literature derived largely from the Roman engineer Vitruvius's De architectura. While her success came from a thorough understanding of geology, Martine was not forthcoming in her writings about her actual methods. Instead, she promoted the idea that she was using magic or then-accepted pseudo-scientific ideas such as divining rods. It is not known for certain why Matine lied about her actual methods, but it may have been to prevent others from capitalizing on her seemingly-unbelievable success, as well as to boost her own reputation among potential clients. Nonetheless, her literature provides a unique glimpse into the craft and skills required to mine in the 17th Century.

== Early life ==
Little is known with certainty about Martine de Bertereau's early life. She was born in France in the late 16th century, but her date and place of birth are uncertain. Earlier accounts have placed her origins in Touraine or Berry and have proposed several different birth years, but modern scholarship has not established a precise place or date of birth.

Bertereau came from a family in which knowledge of mineralogy and mining was hereditary. Little is known about her education, but her later writings show extensive knowledge of mining, mineralogy and methods of locating mineral deposits and groundwater.

During the first decade of the 17th century, Bertereau met Jean du Chastelet, Baron de Beausoleil et d'Auffenbach, while he was working in France as a mineralogist, alchemist and mining engineer. Bertereau and Chastelet married, although the date of their marriage is uncertain.

Bertereau accompanied Chastelet in his work and shared geological and administrative responsibilities with him. The couple worked in France and other parts of Europe, locating mineral deposits and developing mines. Around 1625, they appear to have settled more permanently in France. In 1626, Chastelet received a commission from Antoine Coëffier de Ruzé, marquis d'Effiat, the French superintendent-general of finances and mines. By this time, the couple had left one of their sons, Hercule du Chastelet, in Hungary to occupy a mining position previously held by his father. Kenny estimates from this evidence that at least one of their children was probably born by about 1605.

The number of Bertereau and Chastelet's children is uncertain. Around 1641, the French abbot Jean du Vergier de Hauranne, abbé de Saint-Cyran, referred in a letter to their daughter Anne du Chastelet as being about twelve years old, placing her birth around 1628–1630. The same letter reported that Bertereau was seeking information about five or six other children and asking who was supporting them. On the basis of this evidence, Kenny estimates that Bertereau's children were born over a period extending from at least about 1605 to 1629.

== Later life ==
In 1627, their son, Hercule, fell ill of "flaming heat in the intestines", and spent a few weeks recovering in Chateau-Thierry. During this time, Martine discovered a natural spring nearby and claimed it had healing powers, informing the local doctor of her find. The town subsequently became an attraction in which the ailed and wealthy visited. Today, geological historian Martina Kölbl-Ebert has proven this to be a long-lived form of scientific fraud. Later that year, while at their mining base in Morlaix, Brittany, the local clergy took the claims of mystical abilities seriously, and accused Martine and her husband of witchcraft. No charges were made, but the couple were forced to leave France and fled to Germany, and then Hungary. After being unable to recoup their losses, they returned to France.

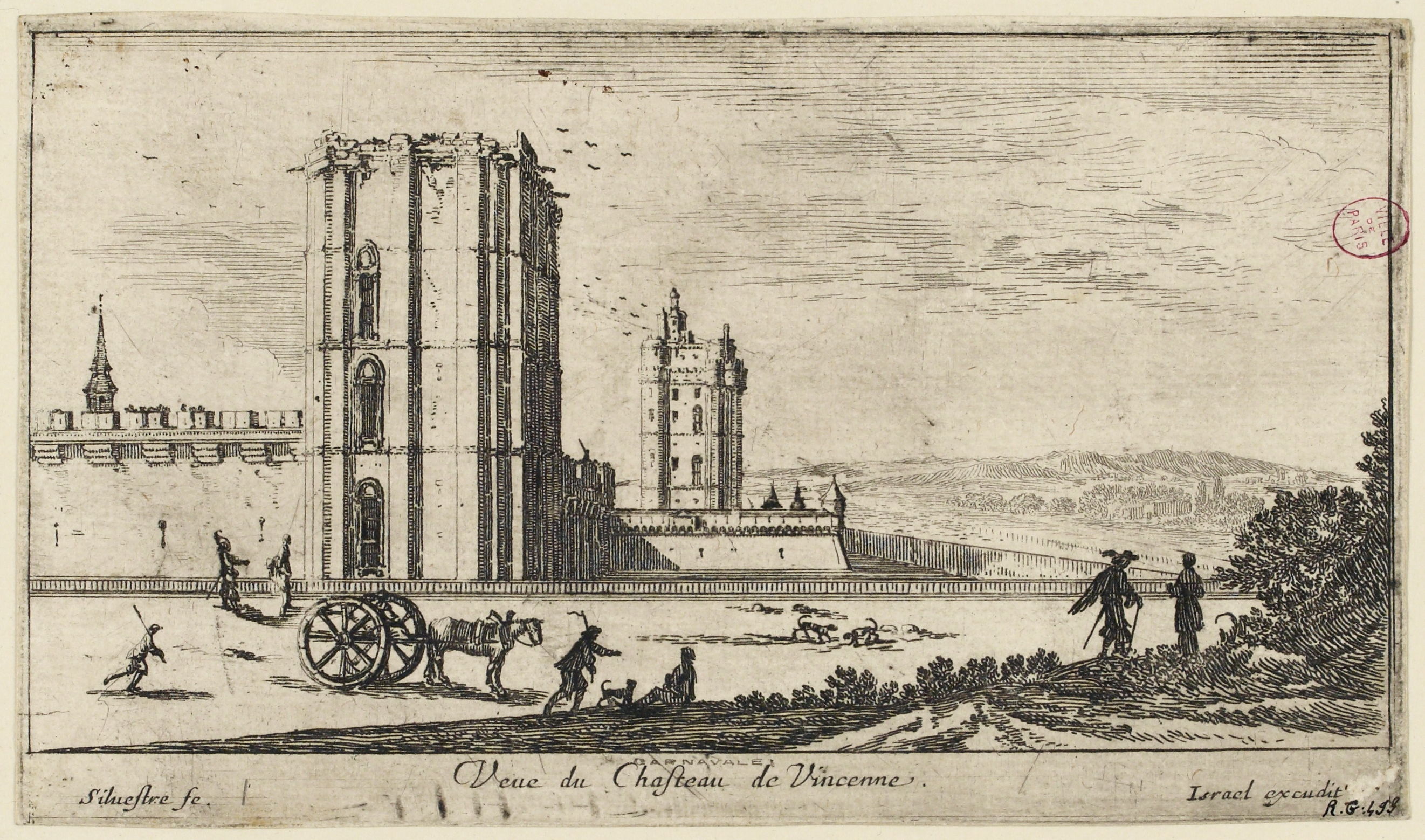
Château de Vincennes where Martine de Bertereau was imprisoned

In 1632, Martine wrote to King Louis XIII in hopes of receiving permission to excavate the mines she and Jean had found before fleeing. In her letter, she proposed a business model in which they could find more precious materials using questionable methods such as divining rods, things that neither she and her husband actually employed. Nonetheless, once these dubious methods are removed from her proposal, the document details a reasonably sound methodology for detecting mineral deposits. In 1640, after no response from the King and feeling that she and Jean had not been paid for their work, Martine wrote to the king's secretary, Cardinal Richelieu, and again did not receive a response. Two years after her letter to Richelieu, she was arrested, along with her husband and eldest daughter, on the charges of palm reading, horoscopy, and astrology. Martine and her daughter were imprisoned at the Château de Vincennes, while the Baron was sent to the Bastille. All three died in prison sometime after 1642.

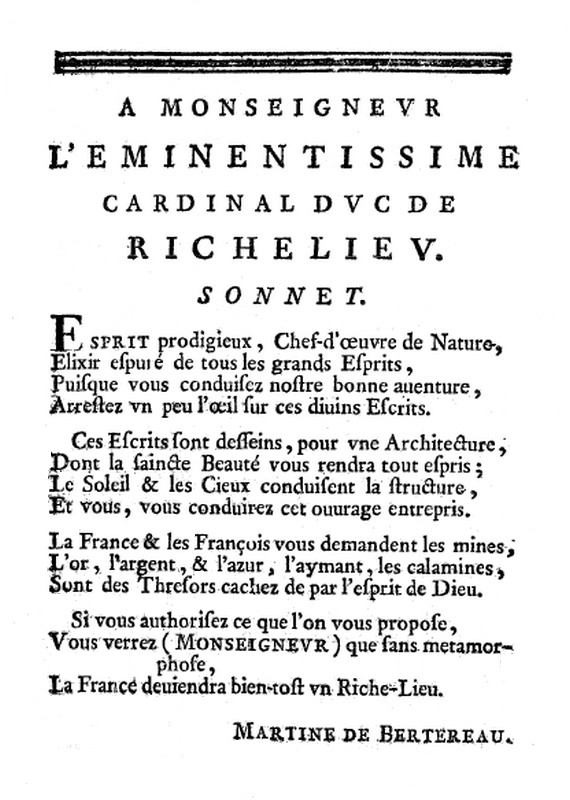
Sonnet dedicated to Cardinal Richelieu written by Martine Bertereau in her book The Return of Pluto, 1640

== Works ==
The baroness wrote two reports on her work with her husband. The first, titled Véritable déclaration de la découverte des mines et minières was sent to Louis XIII in 1632 and listed 150 French mines the couple had discovered. The first article also describes mineral deposits in France, as well as the somewhat ‘esoteric’ use of dowsing rods to locate water. This document also contains many practical and scientific considerations that allow us to understand the state-of-the-art hydrogeology of the 17th Century.

The second was in the form of poetry, addressed to Cardinal de Richelieu La restitution de pluton (1640), which in reality is a plea for the couple, more specifically for Martine, to be paid for the work they undertook for the king. In it she seeks to defend her unusual position as a woman in the mining industry.

"But how about what is said by others about a woman who undertakes to dig holes in and pierce mountains: this is too bold, and surpasses the forces and industry of this sex, and perhaps, there is more empty words and vanity in such promises (vices for which flighty persons are often remarked) than the appearance of truth. I would refer this disbeliever, and all those who arm themselves with such and other like arguments, to profane histories, where they will find that, in the past, there have been women who were not only bellicose and skilled in arms, but even more, expert in arts and speculative sciences, professed so much by the Greeks as by the Romans.”

== Bibliography ==
- Wonderful history in modern times, Louis Figuier, Hachette, Paris, 1860
- The Veterans mineralogists of the kingdom of France, Nicolas Godet, Ruault, Paris, 1779
- Biography universal ancient and modern, Michaud, Paris, 1843
