= Ernst Weinschenk =

German mineralogist and petrologist (1865–1921)

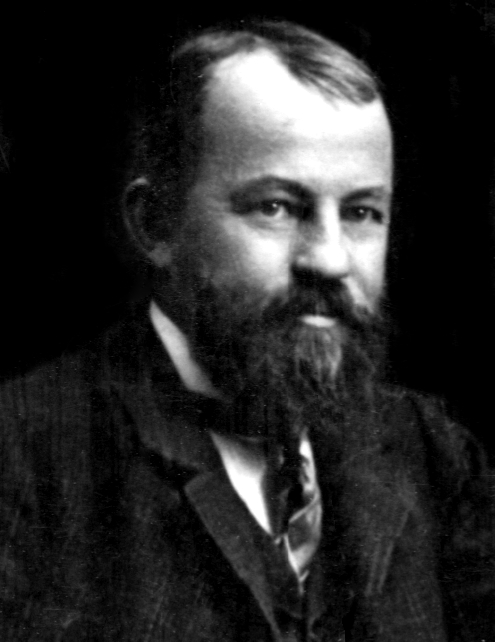
- Ludwig-Maximilians-Universität München, 1909
- Scientific career
- Fields: Mineralogy, Petrography

Ernst Heinrich Oskar Kasimir Weinschenk (6 April 1865, Esslingen am Neckar – 26 March 1921, Munich) was a German mineralogist and petrologist.

He served as a professor at the Technische Hochschule München from 1897 until 1921, and at the Ludwig-Maximilians-Universität München from 1900. His scientific research included mineralogical analysis of meteorites, and studies of contact-metamorphic mineralization in the Alpine region of Central Europe. He also conducted investigations on the origin of the sulfidic ore deposit at Silberberg in the Bavarian Forest, as well as the genesis of graphite deposits near Passau. Through the use of polarizing microscopy and thin sectioning, he determined numerous new minerals.

== Written works ==
Weinschenk's Grundzüge der Gesteinskunde was translated into English in 1916 by Albert Johannsen as "The fundamental principles of petrology". With mineralogist Konrad Oebbeke (1853–1932), he published editions 6 (1899) & 7 (1913) of Wolfgang Franz von Kobell's Lehrbuch Der Mineralogie : in leichtfasslicher Darstellung. Other works by Weinschenk include:

- Allgemeine Gesteinskunde, 1902 – General petrology
- Specielle Gesteinskunde, 1905 – Special petrology
- "Petrographic methods", the authorized English translation of Part I, Anleitung zum gebrauch des polarisationsmikroskops (3d rev. ed.) and Part II, Die gesteinsbildenden mineralien (2d rev. ed.) – translated into English by Robert Watson Clark.
- Allgemeine Gesteinskunde als Grundlage der Geologie, 1913 – General petrology and foundation of geology.
- Petrographisches vademekum : ein Hilfsbuch für Geologen, Geographen und Technike. 1924 – Petrographic handbook, a book for geologists, geographers, and technicians.
- Das Polarisationsmikroskop 1925 – The polarization microscope.

The mineral weinschenkite, also known as "churchite-(Y)", is named after him.
