= Paul Ramdohr =

German mineralogist (1890–1985)

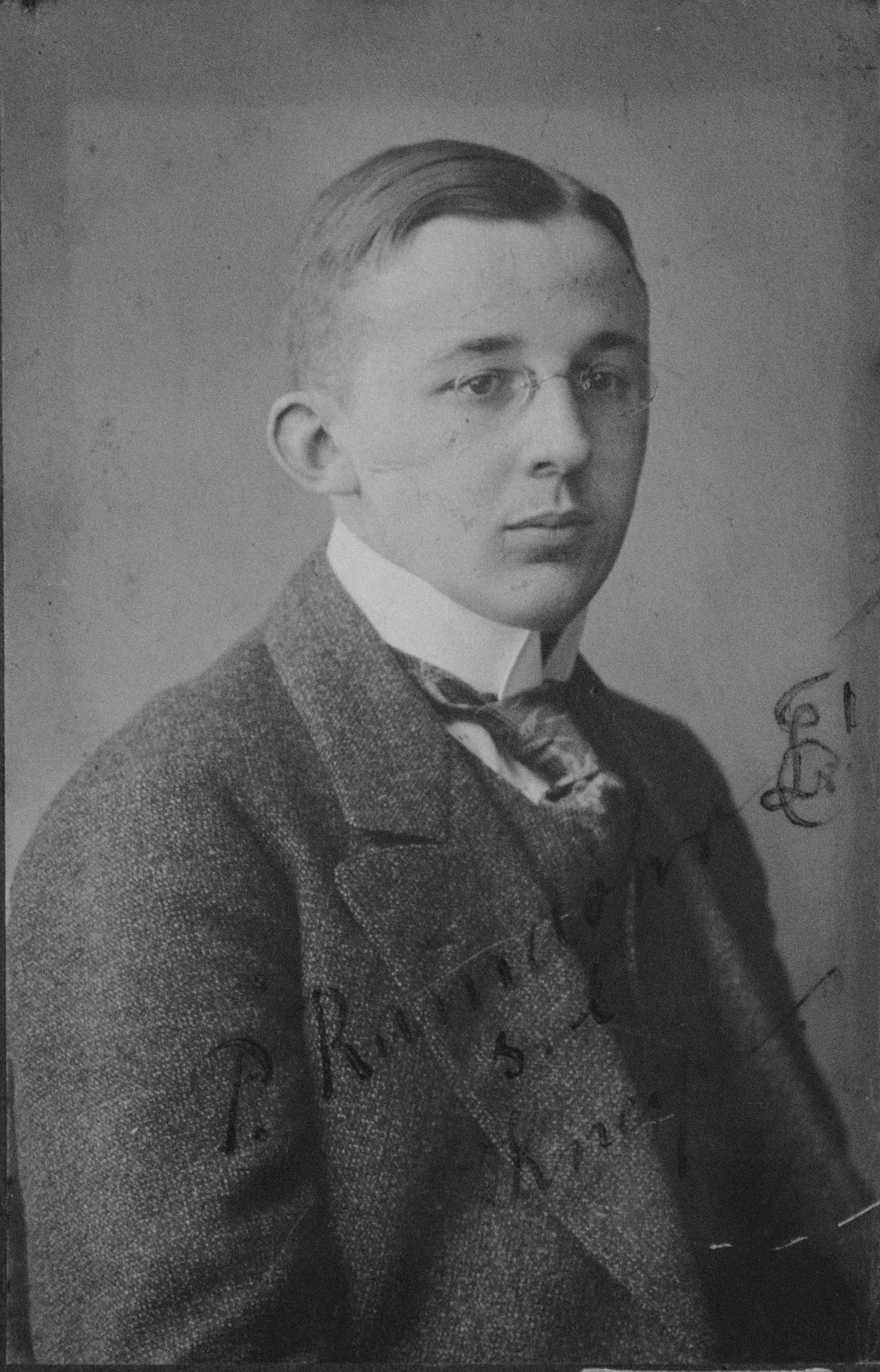
Paul Ramdohr as a member of student fraternity Leonensia in Heidelberg (1909)

Paul A. Ramdohr (1 January 1890 in Überlingen – 8 March 1985 in Hohensachsen/Weinheim), was a German mineralogist, ore deposit-researcher and a pioneer of ore microscopy.

== Life ==
After attending school at the "Alten Gymnasium" of Darmstadt and studying at the University of Heidelberg, he earned his Doctorate in 1919 under the direction of Otto Mügge in Göttingen with a Dissertation on Basalts of the Blauen Kuppe near Eschwege. As a student in Heidelberg, Ramdohr joined the fraternity Leonensia. His Habilitation was completed soon thereafter under the direction of W. Bruhns on the topic of the Gabbros in the area of Böllstein/Brombachtal. In 1926, he took a position at the University of Aachen as Professor of Mineralogy, Petrography and Ore Geology. In 1934 he moved to the Humboldt University of Berlin, and in 1951 to the University of Heidelberg. There he occupied the Professorship of Mineralogy, which he held until 1958.

Paul Ramdohr was married and had four sons and one daughter.

== Publications ==
- 1926: Kristallographie, Göschen-Band together with Willy Bruhns
- 1931–1934: Lehrbuch der Erzmikroskopie Vols. 1 und 2, with Hans Schneiderhöhn
- 1936: Lehrbuch der Mineralogie together with Friedrich Klockmann
- 1924: Beobachtungen an opaken Erzen
- 1928: Über den Mineralbestand und die Strukturen der Erze des Rammelbergs
- 1948: Lehrbuch der Mineralogie 13. Edition, with Klockmann
- 1950: Die Erzmineralien und ihre Verwachsungen
- 1954: Lehrbuch der Mineralogie 14. Edition, with Klockmann
- 1955: Petrografie Göschen-Band 4. Edition
- 1955: The ore minerals and their intergrowth edited by ILMEN, 2014
- 1960: Petrographie (Gesteinskunde), with Willy Bruhns
- 1965: Kristallographie Göschen-Band
- 1973: The opaque minerals in stony meteorites
- 1975: Die Erzmineralien und ihre Verwachsungen 4. Auflage
- 1978: Lehrbuch der Mineralogie 16. Auflage together with Klockmann and Karl Hugo Strunz
- 1980: The ore minerals and their intergrowth 2nd Edition

=== Honorary Doctorates ===
- 1955: Dr.-Ing. E.h. (TU Berlin)
- 1960: Dr. rer. Nat. h.c. (RWTH Aachen)
- 1968: Ph. D. Es. Sci. (Universität Nancy)
- 1969: Dr. rer. Nat. h.c. (TU Clausthal)
- 1973: Dr.-Ing. de Minas, h.c. (Madrid)

=== Prizes and Honors ===
- 1937: Membership in the Prussian Academy of Science
- 1936–1947: President of the German Mineralogical Society
- 1951: Membership in the Heidelberg Academy of Science
- 1962: Roebling Medal of the Mineralogical Society of America
- 1965–1985: Honorary President of the SGA
- 1970: Georg-Agricola-Medal
- 1978: Penrose Gold Medal
- 1979: Leonard Medal
