= Hjalmar Sjögren =

Swedish geologist and mineralogist

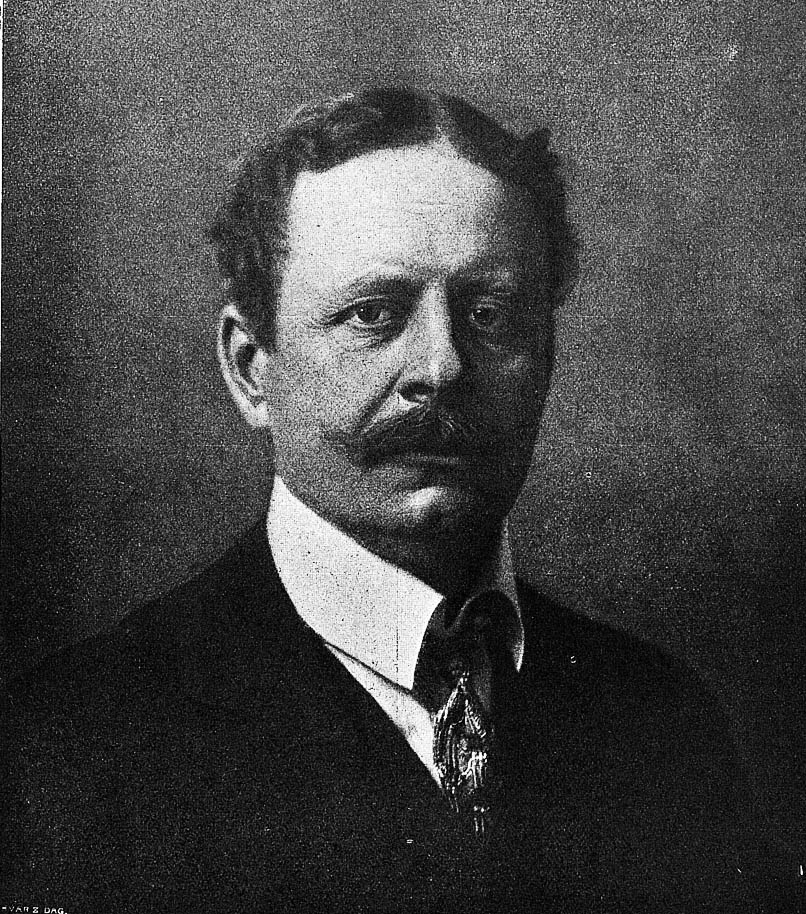
- Cover of magazine Hvar 8 dag no. 42, 1906.
- Born: 13 June 1856; Färnebo, Sweden
- Died: 23 March 1922 (aged 65); Stockholm, Sweden
- Resting place: Nynäs Gård, Nynäshamn
- Education: KTH Royal Institute of Technology
- Spouse: Anna Maria Elisabeth Nobel
- Scientific career
- Fields: Geology, Mineralogy
- Workplaces: Uppsala University; Naturhistoriska Riksmuseet
- Thesis: Kristallografisk undersökning af chondrodit och humit från svenska fyndorter (1882)

Sten Anders Hjalmar Sjögren (13 June 1856, Färnebo, Värmland – 23 March 1922, Stockholm) was a Swedish geologist and mineralogist.

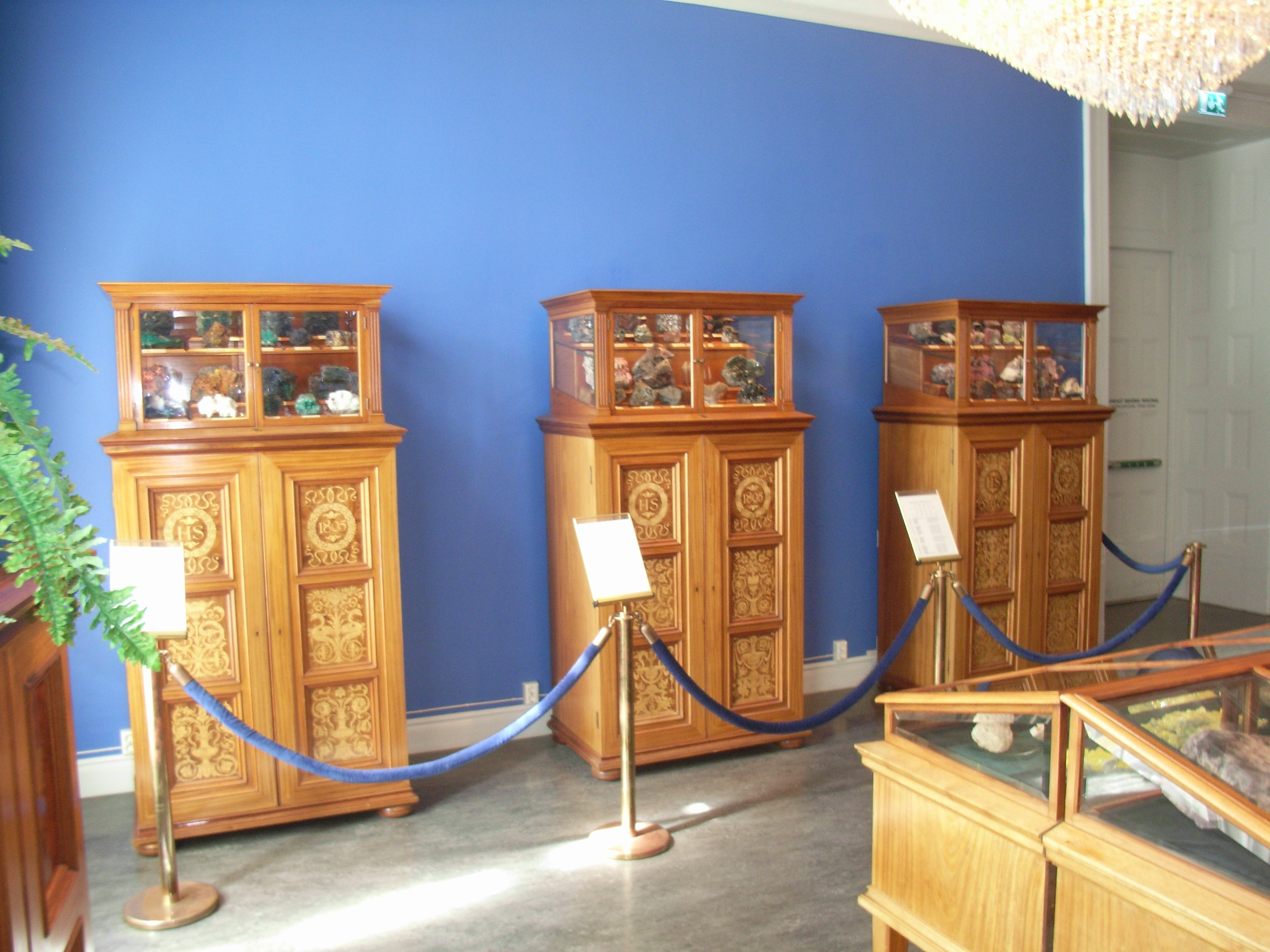
Exhibition of the Hjalmar Sjögren collection at the Swedish Museum of Natural History

== Biography ==
Sten Anders Hjalmar Sjögren became associate professor of mineralogy and geology at Uppsala University from 1882-84. He studied in Germany and Austria-Hungary in 1883.

From 1885-89 was staff geologist at the Branobel company in Baku. In these years he travelled in the Caucasus, Armenia and Persia. He was appointed full professor of mineralogy and geology in Uppsala in 1888 but he resigned from this post in 1894. From 1892 he published at his family expense, the journal "Bulletin of the Geological Department of the University of Uppsala." In 1903 he was appointed curator (after Adolf Erik Nordenskiöld) at the Swedish Museum of Natural History mineralogy department where his collection is conserved.

Sjögren published numerous papers in mineralogy and geology in foreign journals and worked on the third edition of his father's Textbook of Mineralogy of elementary-secondary school and technical schools (1880).
