= Warren D. Huff =

American geologist (born 1937)

- Born: April 16, 1937 (age 89); Omaha, Nebraska, U.S.
- Education: Harvard College; University of Cincinnati
- Scientific career
- Fields: geology
- Workplaces: University of Cincinnati

Warren D. Huff (born April 16, 1937) is Professor of Geology at the University of Cincinnati (UC). He specializes in clay mineralogy, researching the remnants of ancient volcanic eruptions.

He received his BA from Harvard College, 1959 and his PhD from University of Cincinnati, 1963. He has served as assistant professor at UC 1963-1969, associate professor 1969-1985, full professor 1985 to date. He teaches introductory geology sequence.

Member of the Geological Society of America, Society for Sedimentary Geology, The Clay Minerals Society (and associate editor of their journal), the Mineralogical Society of America.
