= List of people from Kiel =

The following is a list of notable people who were born in Kiel.

== Born in Kiel ==
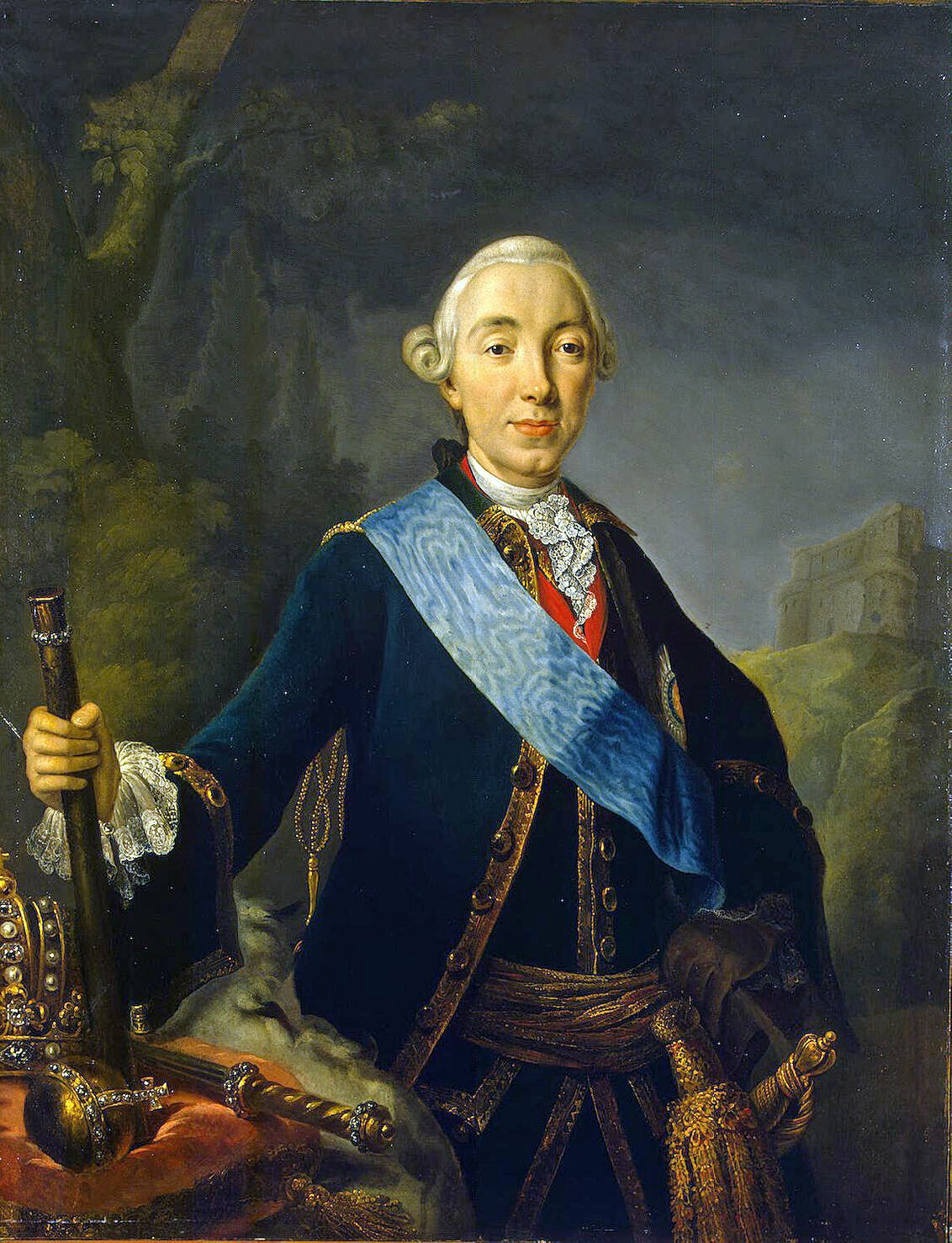
Peter III of Russia (1728–1762)

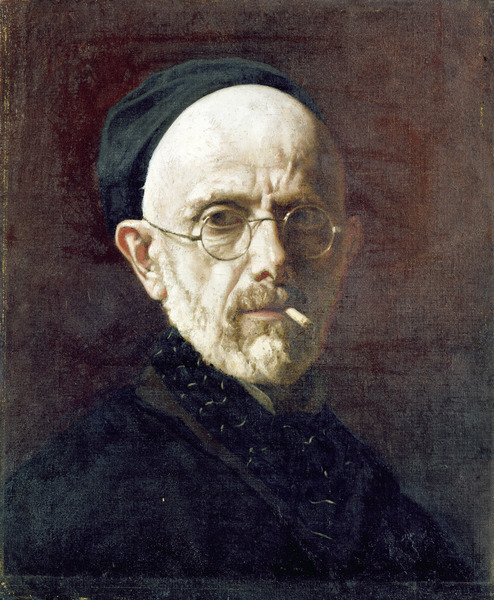
Henri Lehmann

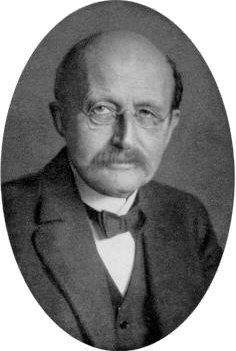
Max Planck (1858–1947), physicist

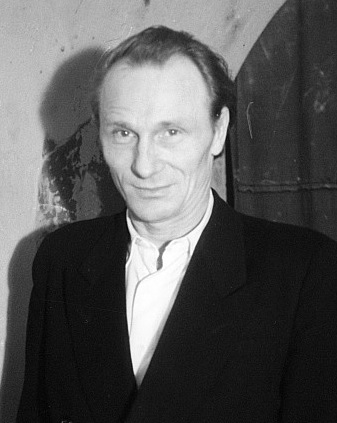
Ernst Busch (1900–1980), East German actor and singer

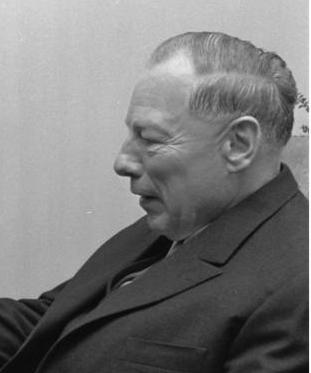
Helmut Lemke

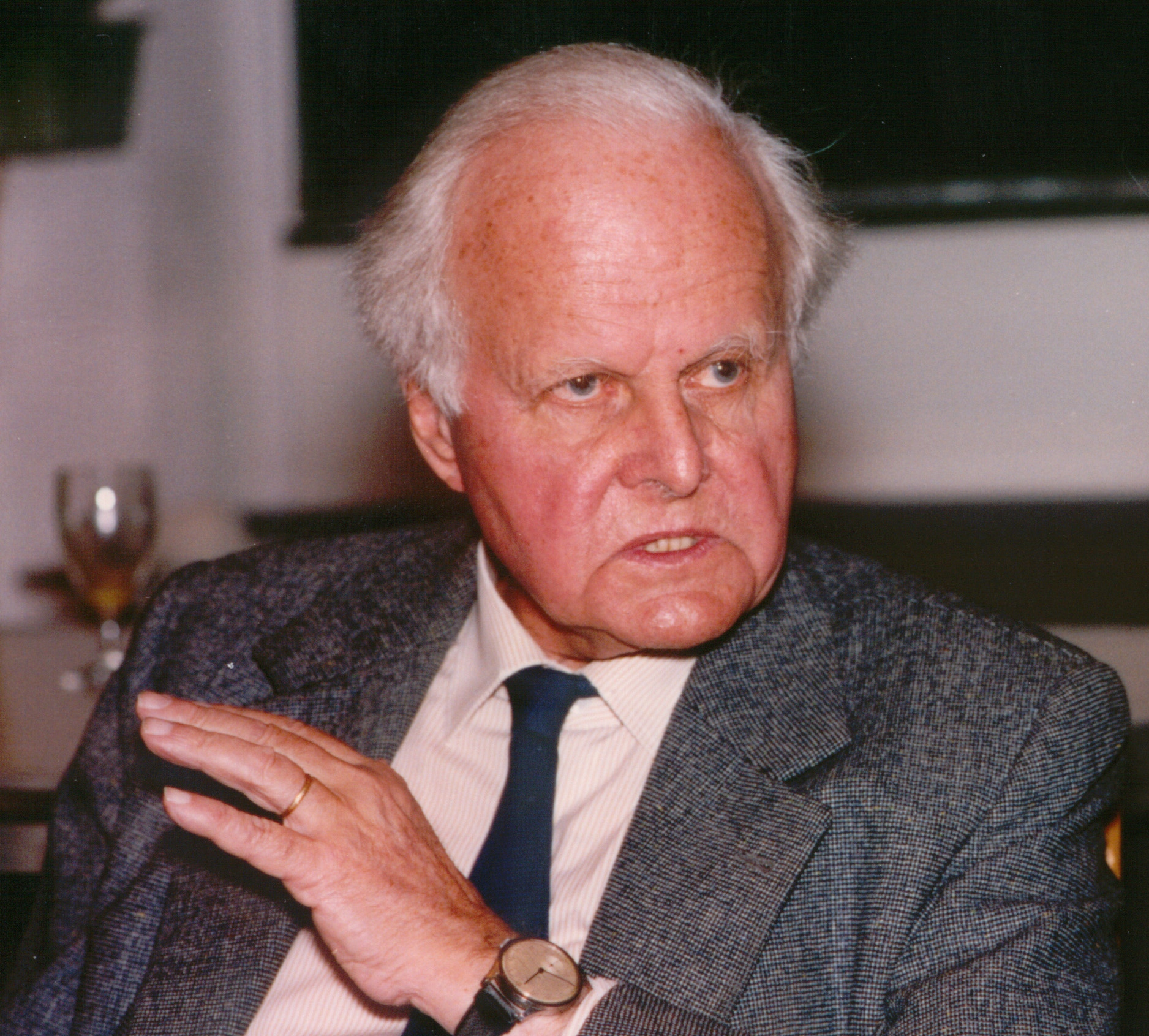
Carl Friedrich von Weizsäcker (1912–2007)

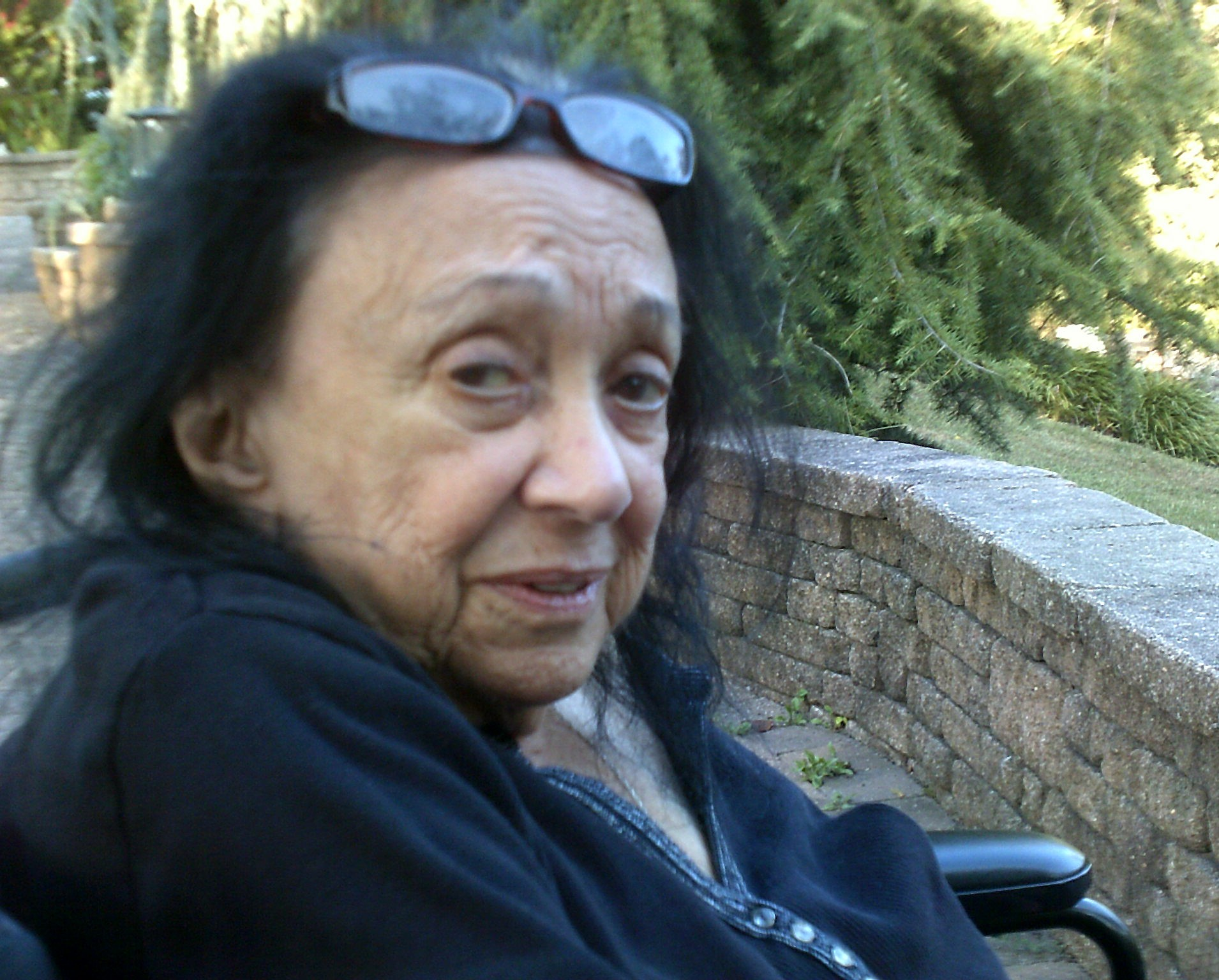
Judith Malina

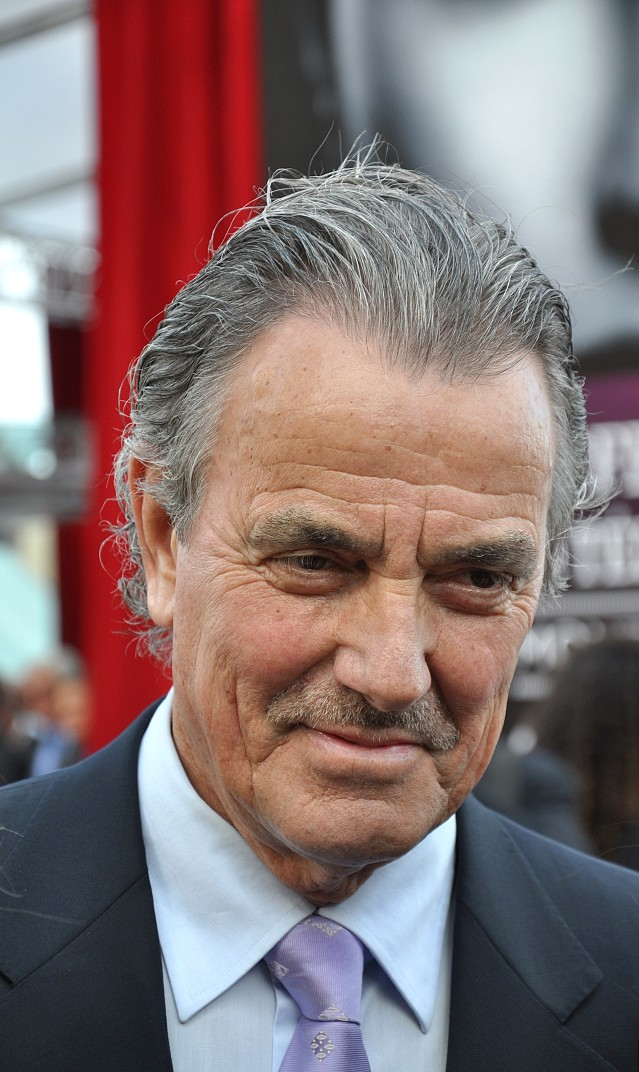
Eric Braeden

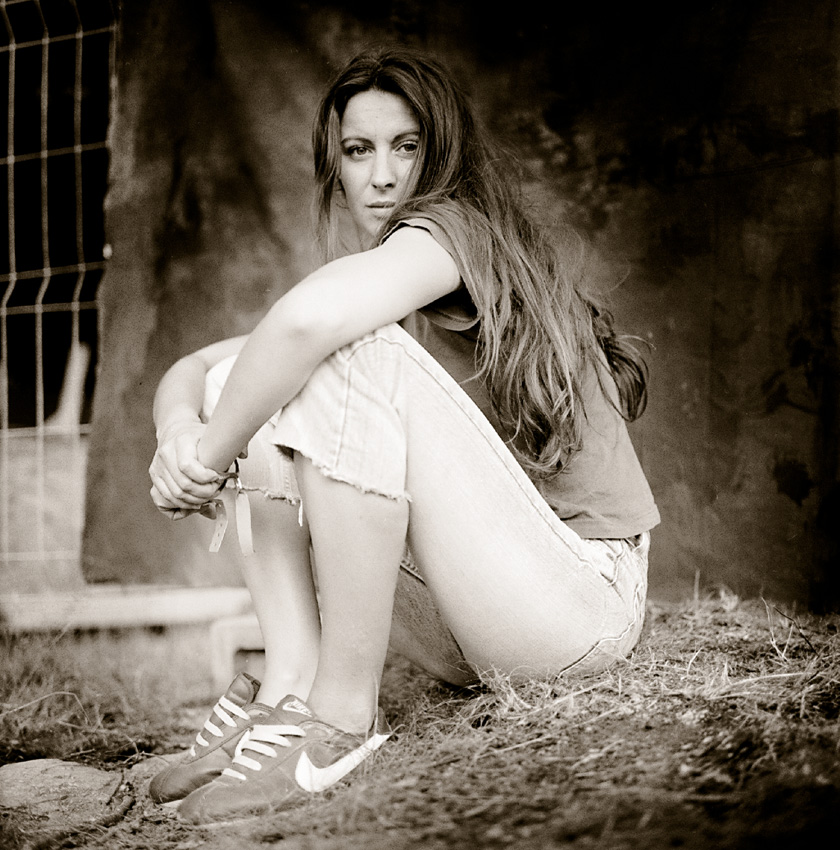
Cora E.

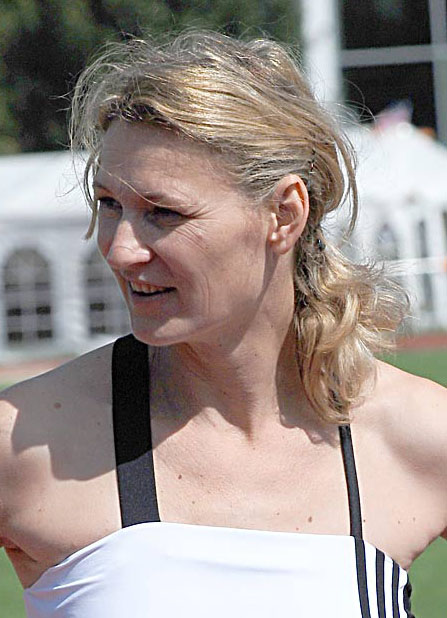
Heike Henkel, high jumper

=== Up to 1800 ===
- Peter III of Russia (1728–1762), emperor of Russia for six months in 1762.
- Johannes Nikolaus Tetens (1736–1807), German-Danish philosopher and statistician
- Karl Leonhard Reinhold (1757–1823), an Austrian philosopher
- Johan Ludwig Lund (1777–1867), Danish painter
- Carl Loewe (1796–1869), composer, tenor singer and conductor
- Gustav Adolf Michaelis (1798–1848), obstetrician and physician

=== 1801 to 1850 ===
- August Howaldt (1809–1889), founder of Howaldtswerke
- Friedrich Wilhelm Hermann Delffs (1812–1894), chemist
- Otto Jahn (1813–1869) an archaeologist, philologist and writer on art and music.
- Henri Lehmann (1814–1882), born French historical painter and portraitist
- Adolf Michaelis (1835–1910), classical scholar, a professor of art history
- Robert Michaelis von Olshausen (1835–1915), obstetrician and gynecologist
- August Mau (1840–1909), art historian and archaeologist
- August Leskien (1840–1916), linguist, active in comparative linguistics
- Detlev von Liliencron (1844–1909), lyric poet and novelist
- Hermann Graedener (1844–1929), composer, conductor and teacher

=== 1851 to 1900 ===
- Ferdinand Tönnies (1855–1936), sociologist, philosopher
- Kuno Francke (1855–1930), American educator and historian at Harvard University
- Friedrich Ferdinand of Schleswig-Holstein-Sonderburg-Glücksburg (1855–1934), the fourth Duke of Schleswig-Holstein-Sonderburg-Glücksburg, became Duke of Schleswig-Holstein in 1931
- Eduard Schwartz (1858–1940), classical philologist, wrote about the second Catilinarian conspiracy
- Max Planck (1858–1947), theoretical physicist whose work on quantum mechanics won him the Nobel Prize in Physics in 1918
- Johannes Weiss (1863–1914), Protestant theologian and Biblical exegete
- George Eyser (1870–1919) German-American gymnast
- Ernst Steinitz (1871–1928), mathematician, wrote on projective configuration
- Anton Schifferer (1871–1943), business executive and politician (NLP; DVP)
- Hans Geiger (1882–1945), physicist, co-invented the Geiger–Müller Counter in 1928
- Hans Anton Aschenborn (1888–1931), animal painter of African wildlife
- Paul Werner Wenneker (1890–1979), admiral and diplomat
- Alfred Brinckmann (1891–1967), chess International Master and author
- Carl Zuckmayer (1896–1977), writer and playwright
- Bruno Diekmann (1897–1982), politician (SPD), Minister-President of Schleswig-Holstein 1949–1950
- Karl Ristenpart (1900–1967), conductor
- Ernst Busch (1900–1980), actor, singer, writer and collector of songs

=== 1901 to 1925 ===
- Rudolf Hell (1901–2002), inventor, invented the Hellschreiber
- Kurt Otto Friedrichs (1901–1982), American mathematician, worked on partial differential equations
- Ernst von Salomon (1902–1972), national-revolutionary writer and right-wing Freikorps member
- Eduard Wald (1905–1978), Communist politician, trade unionist and member of the German Resistance against Nazism
- Walther Müller (1905–1979), physicist, co-invented the Geiger–Müller Counter 1928
- Heinrich Heesch (1906–1995), mathematician, worked on Group theory
- Helmut Lemke (1907–1990), Minister-President of Schleswig-Holstein 1963-1971
- Harro Schulze-Boysen (1909–1942), Resistance fighter
- Herbert Schultze (1909–1987), U-boat commander
- Klaus Wittkugel (1910–1985), commercial and poster artist in the East Germany
- Lauritz Lauritzen (1910–1980), politician (SPD)
- Erna Flegel (1911–2006), nurse in the Führerbunker
- Elisabeth von Janota-Bzowski (1912–2012), graphic artist known for her postage stamps designs
- Karl Hass (1912–2004), German Lieutenant-Colonel in the SS
- Carl Friedrich von Weizsäcker (1912–2007), physicist, philosopher
- Hermann Michel (1912–1984?), SS officer
- Otto Kretschmer (1912–1998), U-boat commander
- Joachim Hamann (1913–1945), Baltic-German Nazi SS officer
- Hajo Herrmann (1913–2010), World War II Luftwaffe pilot and officer
- Heinrich Wöhlk (1913–1991), optometrist, invented the plastic contact lens
- Sigrid Hunke (1913–1999), author, made claims of Muslim influence over Western values
- Heinrich Springer (1914–2007), Waffen-SS knights cross winner
- Kunigunde Bachl (1919–1994), member of the Landtag of Schleswig-Holstein
- Eberhard Blum (1919–2003), fourth head of the German Federal Intelligence Bureau
- Heinrich Dahlinger (1922–2008), field handball player
- Shimon Wincelberg (1924–2004), American television writer and Broadway playwright

=== 1926 to 1950 ===
- Judith Malina (1926–2015), American actress
- Elyakim Haetzni (1926–2022), Israeli lawyer and member of the Knesset
- Ulric Gustav Neisser (1928–2012), American psychologist and member of the US National Academy of Sciences
- Oswalt Kolle (1928–2010), sex educator
- Gerhard Stoltenberg (1928–2001), politician (CDU), minister and minister-president
- Manfred Rulffs (1935–2007), rower
- Heiner Zieschang (1936–2004), mathematician, was a topologist
- Heiko Braak (born 1937), anatomist, contributed to the neuropathology of Alzheimer's disease and Parkinson's disease
- Eckart Johannes Wagner (1938–2002), sailor
- Ilse Gramatzki (born 1939), operatic mezzo-soprano and contralto
- Eric Braeden (born 1941), German-American actor
- Dieter Laser (1942–2020), actor
- Marina Lewycka (born 1946), British novelist of Ukrainian origin
- Egon Müller (born 1948), motorcycle speedway rider

=== 1951 to 1975 ===
- Manfred Stahnke (born 1951), composer and musicologist
- Ewald Schnug (born 1954), agricultural researcher, professor, Honorary-President of the International Scientific Center for Fertilizers
- Duchess Donata of Mecklenburg (born 1956), senior remaining member of the House of Mecklenburg-Schwerin
- Axel Milberg (born 1956), actor
- Anke Ehlers (born 1957), psychologist, expert in post traumatic stress disorder
- Marion Herdan (born 1958), politician
- Andreas Brandstätter (1959–2006), diplomat
- Ilme Schlichting (born 1960), biophysicist studied biomolecules using protein crystallography
- Thilo Martinho (born 1960), musician, singer, guitarist and songwriter
- Michael F. Feldkamp (born 1962), historian and journalist
- Andreas Köpke (born 1962), footballer
- Heike Henkel (born 1964), high jumper, 1992 Olympic winner
- Feridun Zaimoğlu (born 1964), German author and playwright
- Detlev Bork (born 1967), classical and flamenco guitarist
- Tomma Abts (born 1967), painter and Turner Prize winner
- Susanne Gaschke (born 1967), journalist and politician
- Fritz Felgentreu (born 1968), politician (SPD)
- Cora E. (born 1968), hip-hop artist
- Daniel Günther (born 1973), politician (CDU)
- Francisco Copado (born 1974), footballer
- Gesche Joost (born 1974), design researcher, e.g. on human-computer interaction
- Kim Dotcom (born 1974), German-Finnish Internet entrepreneur and political activist

=== Since 1976 ===
- Alexander Bommes (born 1976), handball player and journalist
- Ulrich Schnauss (born 1977), electronic musician and producer
- Daniel Ansorge (born 1978), electronic musician, producer and DJ
- Britta Carlson (born 1978), footballer
- Lasse Rempe-Gillen (born 1978), mathematician
- Rasmus Vöge (born 1979), politician
- Caspar Frantz (born 1980), classical pianist
- Sidney Sam (born 1988), footballer
- Laura Freigang (born 1998), footballer
- Selina Cerci (born 2000), footballer
