= Brunstetter =

Brunstetter is a surname. Notable people with the surname include:

- Bekah Brunstetter (born 1982), American screenwriter and playwright
- Peter S. Brunstetter (born 1956), American politician
- Wanda E. Brunstetter, American novelist

== See also ==
- Branstetter
