= John Hanger =

American politician

Secretary of Planning and Policy of Pennsylvania
- In office January 20, 2015 – February 26, 2016
- Governor: Tom Wolf
- Preceded by: Jennifer Branstetter
- Succeeded by: Sarah Galbally

Secretary of Environmental Protection of Pennsylvania
- In office September 2008 – January 2011
- Governor: Ed Rendell
- Preceded by: Kathleen McGinty
- Succeeded by: Michael Krancer

Commissioner of the Pennsylvania Public Utility Commission
- In office 1993 – June 1998
- Governor: Bob Casey Sr.
- Succeeded by: Aaron Wilson Jr.

Personal details
- Born: June 30, 1957 (age 69) Nairobi, Kenya
- Party: Democratic
- Education: Duke University; University of Pennsylvania

John Hanger (born 1957) is the former Pennsylvania Secretary of Planning and Policy, serving on the executive staff of Pennsylvania Governor Tom Wolf.

Hanger has served as Secretary of the Pennsylvania Department of Environmental Protection, a position he held between September 2008 and January 2011 under then-Governor Ed Rendell. He is also a former Commissioner of the Pennsylvania Public Utility Commission and Of Counsel at law firm Eckert Seamans. He was a candidate for Governor of Pennsylvania in 2014, before withdrawing from the primary. He is one of two Pennsylvanians who have served both as a Secretary of the Department of Environmental Protection and as Commissioner of the Pennsylvania Public Utility Commission. (Clifford Jones served as the Chair of the Public Utility Commission and Secretary of the Department of Environmental Resources, the predecessor of DEP.)

== Biography ==
Hanger was born in Nairobi, Kenya, to British parents who then moved to Dublin, Ireland and then to the United States when he was ten years old. In 1979, he graduated with a B.A. from Duke University and in 1984, he graduated with a J.D. from the University of Pennsylvania Law School. He took a job at Community Legal Services where he advocated for people who could not pay their utility bills which eventually led to him taking a position under state representative Joseph Rhodes Jr. and former member of the Pennsylvania Public Utility Commission. In 1993, he was named as Commissioner of the Pennsylvania Public Utility Commission by Governor Bob Casey Sr. In June 1998, Pennsylvania Governor Tom Ridge replaced him as Commissioner of the PUC with Chester mayor, Aaron Wilson Jr., a Republican.

Hanger contributed to writing and passing legislation such as Pennsylvania's 1996 Electricity Generation Competition and Customer Choice Act, the 2004 Alternative Energy Portfolio Standards Act, the 2005 Growing Greener 2 legislation, the 2007 Net Metering statute, the 2008 Act 129 initiating major electricity conservation programs, the 2008 Act 70 requiring DEP to write a climate change action plan, the 2008 Alternative Fuels Act, the 2010 Recycling Fee extension, and others.

Hanger was the founding President of Citizens for Pennsylvania's Future or PennFuture from 1998 to 2008, a public interest organization with the objective of improving the environment and economy.

Hanger has never held an elected office. He was considered a possible candidate for the Democratic nomination for the United States Senate election in 2004 against Arlen Specter.

=== 2014 gubernatorial election ===
After saying that he was "seriously looking" at a possible campaign for Governor of Pennsylvania to seek the Democratic nomination to challenge Republican incumbent Tom Corbett in 2014, he officially announced his candidacy for the office in November 2012. However, he ended his campaign in March 2014, citing unfavorable polling and the surge of fellow candidate Tom Wolf.

His campaign supported the immediate legalization of medical marijuana by allowing doctors to prescribe marijuana for treatment of appropriate conditions and illnesses as is done in 20 other states. He supported removing criminal penalties for possession of small amounts of marijuana as soon as possible, and proposed to later legalize, regulate, and tax recreational marijuana in Pennsylvania.

John Hanger endorsed Tom Wolf in the 2014 Democratic Primary for Governor.
