= Brandstetter =

Brandstetter (German: habitational name for someone from any of the many places called Brandstatt, Brandstädt, Brandstätt, Brandstett and Brandstetten all from the element meaning "place cleared by burning") is a German surname. Notable people with the surname include:

- Alois Brandstetter (born 1938), Austrian writer and philologist
- Hans Brandstetter (1854–1925), Austrian sculptor
- Josef Brandstetter (1891–1945), Austrian amateur football player
- Renward Brandstetter (1860–1942), Swiss philologist and linguist
- Simon Brandstetter (born 1990), German footballer
- Wolfgang Brandstetter (born 1957), Austrian politician and legal scholar

== See also ==
- Brandstätter
- Branstetter
