= Jacob Moleschott =

Dutch physiologist and philosopher (1822–1893)

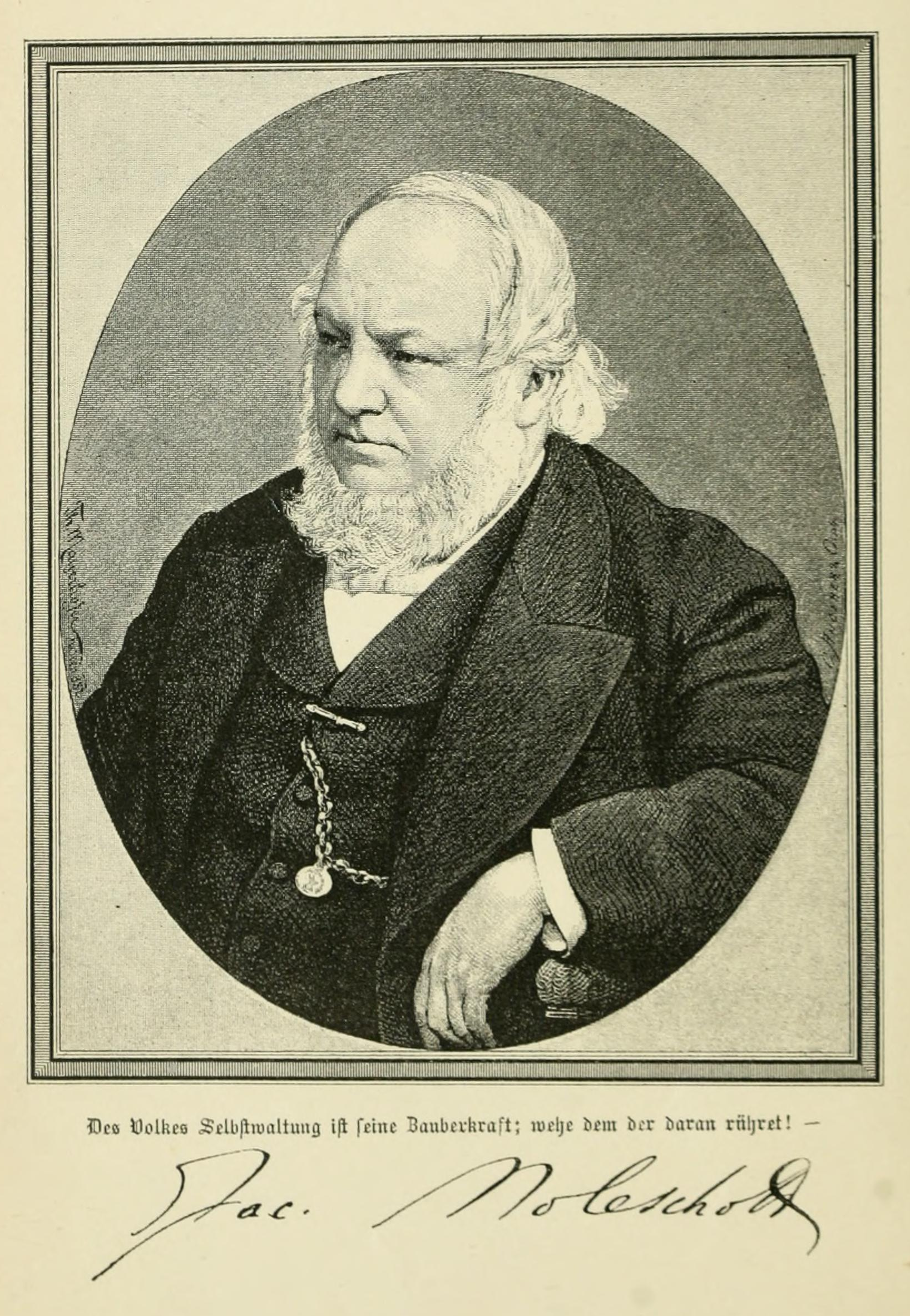
- Born: Jacobus Albertus Willebrordus Moleschott; 9 August 1822 's-Hertogenbosch, United Kingdom of the Netherlands
- Died: 20 May 1893 (aged 70); Rome, Kingdom of Italy

Education
- Education: Heidelberg University

Philosophical work
- Era: 19th-century philosophy
- Region: Western philosophy
- School: German materialism
- Institutions: Heidelberg University; University of Zürich; University of Turin; University of Rome
- Main interests: Philosophy of science

Jacobus Albertus Willebrordus Moleschott (/ˈmoʊləʃɒt/; Dutch: [ˈmoːləsxɔt]; 9 August 1822 – 20 May 1893) was a Dutch physiologist and writer on nutrition and dietetics. He was known for his philosophical and political positions in regard to scientific materialism and against vitalism. He saw a need for scientists to engage in political thinking. He was a member of German Academy of Sciences Leopoldina (since 1884). Although born in the Netherlands, he studied in Germany and later wrote extensively in Italian, especially on "scienza positiva".

== Life ==
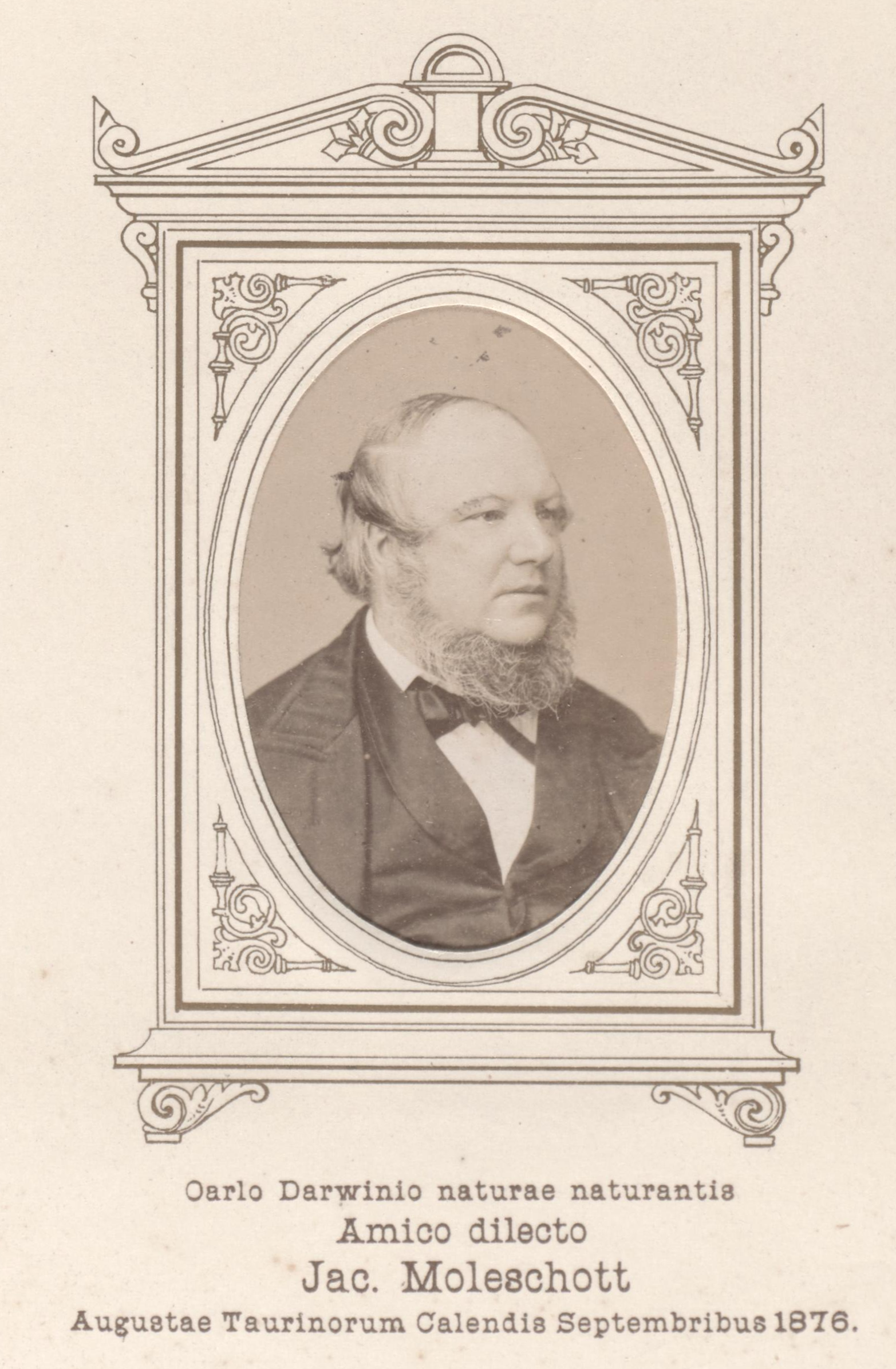
An 1876 photo from an album gifted to Charles Darwin

Jacobus Albertus Willebrordus Moleschott was born in 's-Hertogenbosch, Netherlands, to physician Jo(h)annes Franciscus Gabriel Moleschott (1793–1857) and Elizabeth Antonia (or Antonetta) van der Monde (1795–1866). He went to school at Cleves, and here he learnt Greek and Latin and was encouraged by the school director Ferdinand Helmke. His Latin and Greek teacher Moritz Fleischer also introduced him to Hegelian philosophy. Moleschott's father had been skeptical of religion and discouraged his son from religion and encouraging the natural sciences at an early age. Moleschott studied medicine at Heidelberg University unlike his father who went to Leiden. He studied botany under Theodor Bischoff and chemistry from Wilhelm Delff. Anatomy was taught by Friedrich Tiedemann (1781–1861) and physiology by Leopold Gmelin (1788–1853). His supervisor was Jacob Henle, where he obtained his PhD in 1845. During this period he also became active in a circle of Johann Christian Kapp. He met Justus Liebig in Giessen and Lorenz Oken in Bern and began to form networks. He translated Johannes Mulder's work which he gifted to Gabriel Gustav Valentin in Bern. He passed on Valentin's work to Tiedemann. He moved to Utrecht in 1845 and became an assistant to Mulder. He discussed the physiology of vision with Franciscus Cornelis Donders (1818–1889). He soon moved back to Heidelberg University taking an interest in Mulder's work on nutrition and working as a Privatdozent. Moleschott was also interested in socialism as being helpful in bettering the nutrition of people. A debate between Liebig and Mulder strained Moleschott's relationship with Liebig. Liebig held that carbohydrates alone acted as fuel for the body while Moleschott included the roles of protein and fat. He lectured on physiology starting in 1847 and published Physiologie der Nahrungsmittel (1850) which received praise including from Alexander von Humboldt. He also gave special emphasis to experimental methods. He then extended it with a series of public lectures open to all dealing with anthropology through experimental methods. The university under orders from the Interior Ministry of Baden reprimanded Moleschott for his radical political position, "brutal materialism" and atheism leading to his resignation in 1854. Next to Carl Vogt and Ludwig Büchner, Moleschott stood in the center of the public debates about materialism in Germany in the 1850s.

Moleschott spent two years without an academic post and began to work on the 15-volume Untersuchungen zur Naturlehre des Menschen und der Thiere. He also wrote a biography of Georg Forster who he described as a people's scientist. In 1856 a cookbook that proved to be popular by Wilhelmine Rührig titled Frankfurter Kochbuch, later as Kochbuch fürʼs Deutsche Haus was based on the nutritional theories of Liebig and Moleschott. Moleschott advised the consumption of proteins on a daily basis. Another woman Mathilde Reichardt-Stromberg wrote an essay on morality through rational thought rather than religion using Moleschott's Kreislauf des Lebens. Moleschott received a position in the University of Zurich as a professor of physiology in 1856. He and his wife learned Italian while in Zurich. He then moved to Turin (1861) where he was particularly active in building networks between Swiss, German and Italian researchers. In 1867 he received Italian citizenship. He continued to popularize science and physiology in particular. In 1876 he was appointed as a Senator. In 1878 he moved to La Sapienza in Rome (1879) as professor of experimental physiology. He used his political position to support a lawyer's position for Lidia Poët who had been refused on the ground of being a woman. He also opposed anti-semitism as well as the Macinato or grist tax. On June 9, 1889 he gave a public talk on the inauguration of a statue of Giordano Bruno in the Vatican alongside a speech by Gaetano Trezza (1828–1892). He supported the role of rational thought against the intolerance of the Church.

Moleschott married Sophie Strecker in 1849 and they had two sons and three daughters. She was an amateur poet and helped edit Moleschott's works. She suffered from melacholia in Italy and committed suciide in 1891. Moleschott died in Rome.

A bronze bust by Ettore Ferrari was installed in the University of Turin on June 9, 1893, with a commemorative speech by Cesare Lombroso who had translated Moleschott's Kreislauf des Lebens into Italian.

== Writings ==
Moleschott explained the origin and condition of animals by the working of physical causes. He was an atheist which led to his removal from teaching at the Heidelberg University. His characteristic formulae were "no thought without phosphorus" and "the brain secretes thought as the liver secretes bile."

His major works include:

- Lehre der Nahrungsmittel. Für das Volk (Erlangen, 1850; 3rd edition, Erlangen, 1858)
- Physiologie der Nahrungsmittel (1850; second edition, 1859)
- Physiologie des Stoffwechsels in Pflanzen und Thieren (1851)
- Der Kreislauf des Lebens (1852; fifth edition, 1887)
- Georg Forster, der Naturforscher des Volkes. (1854)
- Untersuchungen zur Naturlehre des Menschen und der tiere (1856–93), continued after his death by Colosanti and Fubini
- Sulla vita umana (1861–67), a collection of essays
- Physiologisches Skizzenbuch (1861)
- Consigli e conforti nei tempi di colera (1864; third edition, 1884)
- Sull' influenza della luce mista e cromatica nell' esalazione di acido carbonico per l'organismo animale (1879), with Fubini
- Kleine Schriften (1880–87), collected essays and addresses
- Für meine Freunde (1894)

The Jacob Moleschott archive is held in the Archiginnasio of Bologna's public library.
