= Johann Reinhard =

Johann Reinhard may refer to:

- Johann Reinhard I, Count of Hanau-Lichtenberg (1569–1625)
- Johann Reinhard II, Count of Hanau-Lichtenberg (1628–1666)
- Johann Reinhard III, Count of Hanau-Lichtenberg (1665–1736)
- Johann Reinhard Blum (1802–1883), German mineralogist

== See also ==
- Johan Reinhard (born 1943), American anthropologist, archaeologist, and explorer
