= Brandstätter =

Brandstätter is a German surname. Notable people with the surname include:

- Andreas Brandstätter (1959–2006), German diplomat
- Hanns Brandstätter (born 1949), Austrian fencer
- Helmut Brandstätter (born 1955), Austrian journalist, author and politician
- Horst Brandstätter (1933–2015), German entrepreneur, owner of Brandstätter Group
- Jim Brandstatter (born 1949/50), American football player
- Karel Brandstätter (born 1915, date of death unknown), Czech rower
- Karin Brandstätter (born 1983), Austrian figure skater
- Kevin Brandstätter (born 1996), Austrian football player
- Maria Kuhnert-Brandstätter (1919–2011), Austrian pharmacist

Additional individuals with the last name Brandstatter (no diacritic) include:

- Eddie Brandstatter (1886–1940), French-American restaurenteur

== See also ==
- Brandstetter
- Branstetter
- Brandstätter Group, German toy company, headquartered in Zirndorf, Germany
