= Quigley =

Quigley is a surname of Irish origin derived from the Gaelic Ó Coigligh meaning "descendant of Coigleach (male)" or Ní Choigligh meaning "descendant of Coigleach (female)."

Variations and derivatives include: Quigly, Quigg, Quickley, MacQuigg, McQuigge, O'Quigley, O'Quigg, Cogley, Twigg and Fivey.

The name may refer to:

== People ==
- Allie Quigley (born 1986), American basketball player
- Andrew Quigley (1860s–1937), Northern Irish politician
- Anne Quigley (born 1955 or 1956), British composer of Catholic hymns
- Brett Quigley (born 1969), American golfer
- Carroll Quigley (1910–1977), American writer and history professor
- Colleen Quigley (born 1992), American distance runner and Olympian
- Dana Quigley (born 1947), American golfer
- Dawn Quigley, Ojibwe-American author and educator
- Dennis Quigley (1913–1984), Scottish footballer
- Derek Quigley (born 1932), New Zealand politician
- Eddie Quigley (1921–1997), English footballer and manager
- Ernie Quigley (1880–1960), Canadian-American sports official
- Fannie Quigley (1870–1944), Alaskan pioneer and prospector
- Frank Granger Quigley (1894–1918), Canadian aviator
- James Edward Quigley (1854–1915), Canadian-American archbishop
- James F. Quigley (1859–1935), Irish-American politician, judge and lawyer
- James M. Quigley (1918–2011), American politician
- Jane Alexander (born 1939), née Quigley, American actress
- Joe Quigley (born 1996), English footballer
- Joe Quigley (athlete) (born 1961), Australian hammer thrower
- Joan Quigley (1927–2014), American astrologer
- Joan M. Quigley (born 1940), American politician
- John Quigley (disambiguation)
- Johnny Quigley (1935–2004), Scottish footballer
- Joy Quigley (born 1948), New Zealand politician
- Linnea Quigley (born 1958), American actress
- Margaret Quigley (born 1979), American actress under the stage name Maggie Q
- Martin Quigley (hurler) (born 1951), Irish hurler
- Martin Quigley (publisher) (1890–1964), American owner of several publications, publisher, editor and journalist
- Martin Quigley Jr. (1917–2011), American publisher, author and politician, son of the above
- Mary Quigley (1960–1977), American murder victim
- Mike Quigley (disambiguation)
- Raymond L. Quigley (1885–1958), American college baseball coach
- Richard Quigley (born 1971), British politician
- Ryan Quigley (born 1990), American football punter
- Sarah Quigley (born 1967), New Zealand author
- Sheila Quigley (1947–2020), English novelist
- Thomas J. Quigley (1905–1960), American school superintendent
- William P. Quigley, American law professor and research director

== Fictional characters ==
- the title character of Grace Quigley, a 1985 film starring Katherine Hepburn
- Jez Quigley, on the British soap opera Coronation Street
- Matthew Quigley, protagonist of the 1990 film Quigley Down Under, played by Tom Selleck
- Misty Quigley, one of the main characters on the TV series Yellowjackets.
