= Crystle =

Crystle may refer to:

== Given name ==
- Crystle Lightning (born 1981), Canadian-American actress and musician
- Crystle Stewart (born 1981), American actress, television host, model and beauty pageant titleholder

== Surname ==
- Charlie Crystle, American entrepreneur and philanthropist
