= John Quigley (Pennsylvania official) =

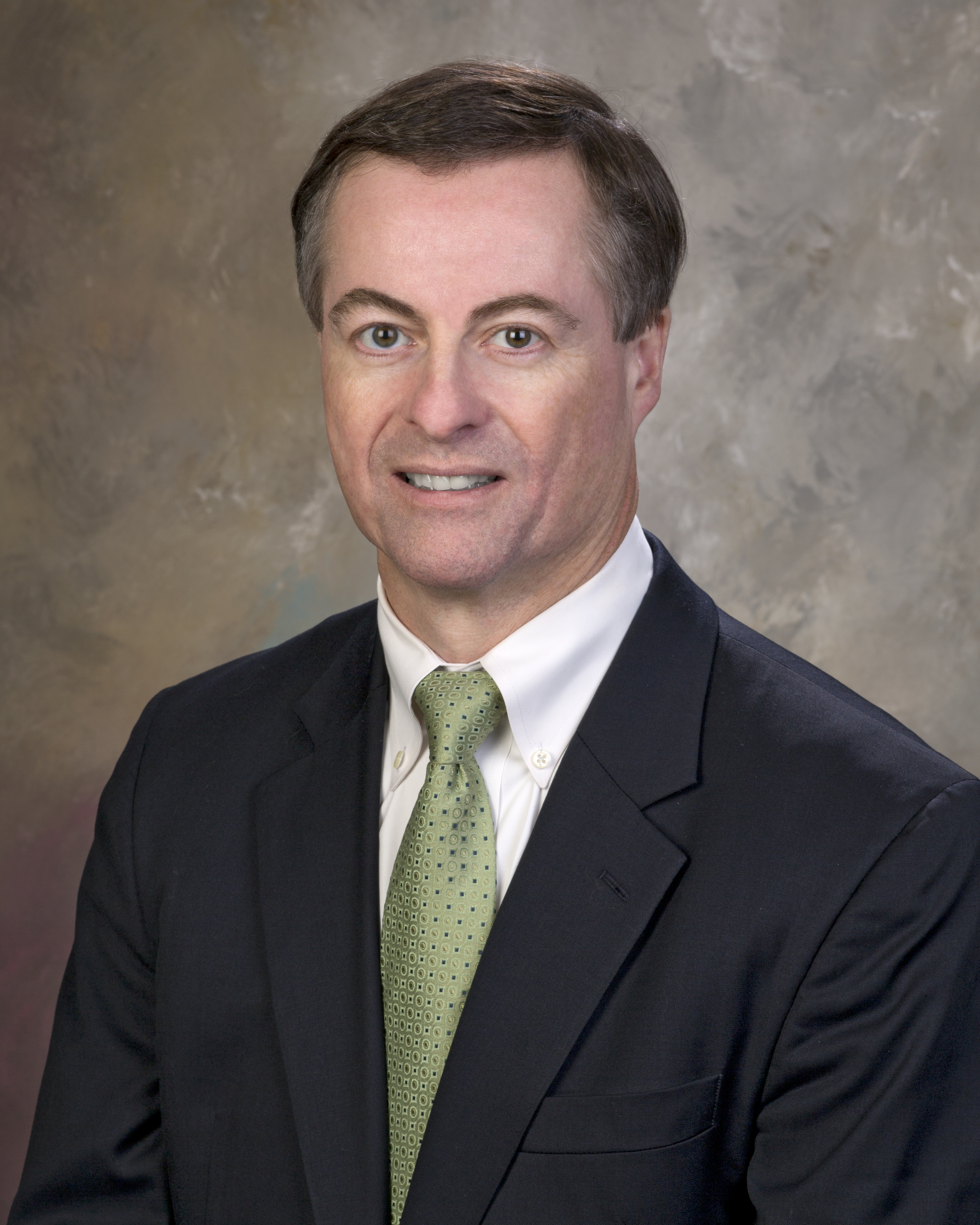
- Quigley in 2015

Secretary of the Pennsylvania Department of Environmental Protection
- In office January 20, 2015 – May 20, 2016
- Governor: Tom Wolf
- Preceded by: Dana Aunkst
- Succeeded by: Patrick McDonnell (acting)

Personal details
- Education: Bloomsburg University; Lehigh University

John Quigley is a former Secretary of the Pennsylvania Department of Environmental Protection, having been nominated by Pennsylvania Governor Tom Wolf and confirmed in June 2015 and serving until his resignation in May 2016. From 2009 to 2011, Quigley served as secretary of the Pennsylvania Department of Conservation and Natural Resources. Prior to his appointment as secretary, Quigley worked for DCNR in several capacities, including overseeing strategic initiatives and operations, and as chief of staff. He is the first and only person in the history of Pennsylvania to hold the positions of both DCNR and DEP Secretary.

== Biography ==
Quigley previously worked in the nonprofit, public, and private sectors, including founding a downtown revitalization non-profit organization, eight years as the mayor of Hazleton, Pennsylvania, instructor in economics at Pennsylvania State University, newspaper columnist, government relations manager with Citizens for Pennsylvania's Future, management positions with manufacturing companies, and four years operating a small business.

He is a graduate of Bloomsburg University with a degree in economics, and holds a Master of Public Administration degree from Lehigh University. He has done additional graduate work in economics.

== Secretary of DCNR ==
As Secretary of the PA DCNR, Quigley leased 68,000 acres of state forest land for unconventional natural gas development, worked with gas companies to develop a set of best management practices, and ordered the development of a comprehensive monitoring program in an attempt to understand the impacts of unconventional natural gas development on state forest lands.

Quigley maintained state forest timber harvests during the Great Recession, after timber prices collapsed, in order to support Pennsylvania's forest products industry.

Quigley led an effort to develop the world's first business plan for a carbon management network, aimed at maintaining coal as part of Pennsylvania's energy future and the state's position as an energy exporter. He led a collaboration with the wind industry, state agencies and stakeholders to design a set of siting standards that are considered national models. He also re-engineered DCNR's grant program, creating a user-friendly, efficient online system that emphasizes best practices, and created the first digital state map in the nation.

== Secretary of DEP ==
Quigley indicated that he aimed to develop a proactive plan to meet the agency's mission of protecting Pennsylvania's air, land and water from pollution and of providing for the health and safety of its citizens through a cleaner environment, and to achieve Governor Wolf's expectation that Pennsylvania's natural resources should help the commonwealth become an energy leader, including in the areas of renewable energy and energy efficiency, as well as a magnet for investment and job creation. Quigley believes that responsible shale gas development is the biggest opportunity to demonstrate his belief that economic development and protection of the environment are essential and, in fact, complementary.

He launched a collaborative effort with all of the stakeholders involved in the pipeline infrastructure build-out process to facilitate efficient, responsible development that addresses environmental, public health, and local concerns.

Quigley resigned from his post, effective immediately, on May 20, 2016.
