= Karl Rössler =

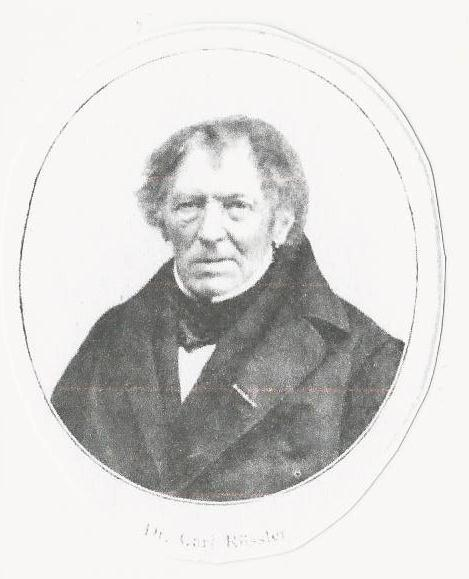
Karl Rössler

Karl Rössler (6 May 1788, in Wiesbaden – 23 August 1863, in Hanau) was a German manufacturer and mineralogist.

After a business apprenticeship in Frankfurt am Main, he acquired a hat factory in 1818 which he transformed into a highly successful company. He had a keen interest in the geology, mineralogy and paleontology of the Wetterau, and accordingly, collected numerous minerals and fossils of the region. Throughout the course of his career, Rössler worked closely with geologist Leopold von Buch.

In 1853 he was named director of the Wetterauische Gesellschaft (Hanau), and in 1858 became a member of the Academy of Sciences Leopoldina. In the year following, Rössler was named a founding member of the Freies Deutsches Hochstift (Free German Foundation) in Frankfurt.

In 1861 the mineral "Rösslerite" was named in his honor by Johann Reinhard Blum. The fossil snail species Turbonilla roessleri (Geinitz, 1852) also bears his name.

== Publications ==
- Übersicht der Wichtigsten geognostischen und oryctognostischen Vorkommnisse der Wetterau und der zunächst angrenzenden Gegenden, 1850/51 (with Gottfried Ludwig Theobald) – Overview of primary geological and mineralogical incidents in Wetterau, etc.
- Über die Petrefacten im Zechstein der Wetterau, 1851 – On petrification in the Zechstein of Wetterau.
