= Thilo Martinho =

German musician

Thilo Martinho (born Thilo Herrmann; 1960 in Kiel, West Germany) is a German musician, singer, guitarist, and songwriter.

== Biography ==
Thilo Martinho, by his real name Thilo Herrmann, was born in Kiel in 1960, the son of Ingeborg Reichelt and Hajo Herrmann.

In his early years, he played piano, bass, and drums. When he was 19, he started playing guitar.

Three years later he was on his way in the European club- and festival-scene, playing acoustic instrumental folk-rock.

Being unsatisfied by the limited mode of expression of the steel-string guitar and influenced by the Spanish flamenco-guitarist Paco de Lucia and the Brazilian musician Egberto Gismonti, he changed to nylon-string guitars and became absorbed in the realm of Classic- and Flamenco-guitars and moved to Spain, to live for years as Flamenco guitarist in Andalusia.

In 1995, after a brain operation, the result of a genetically caused brain-bleeding, he ended up sitting in a wheelchair with hemiplegia. He was told, that the control of the right half of his body was probably for ever lost.

During the following years he started singing, worked mainly as interpreter of Spanish and Brazilian music and the Bossa Nova. He wrote songs in English and German. For copyright reasons in 2005 Thilo Herrmann took on the pseudonym Thilo Martinho, and by this name he produced the CD "I am" in 2007. This album, published on the label "musaraña records", is the result of a musical pilgrimage between bossa-nova, Latin, jazz, flamenco and world music.

"I am" is written in four languages: Spanish, English, Portuguese and German. The song "Wie Das Wasser" is included on this CD. It is a German, lyrical piece of Salsa music in a big band arrangement.

This song, "Wie Das Wasser", won the first prize of the "World Music" category in the "Unisong International Song Contest" 2008 in Los Angeles.

With the same song he was finalist in the "John Lennon Songwriting Contest" in 2008.

Thilo Martinho has overcome his disease and is now back in concert-life and touring. He appears on stage in clubs and theaters.

In 2022 Thilo changed his artist name to "Ziganando" and published digitally his latest album "12" under this new pseudonym.

== Discography ==
- 2000: Granaina (self publishing)
- 2003: Roam & Ride (temple records)
- 2007: I Am (musaraña records)
- 2014: Brisa Latina (musaraña records)
- 2022: 12 (musaraña records)
