= Quigly =

Surname list

Quigly is a surname. Notable people with the surname include:

- Isabel Quigly (1926–2018), English writer and translator
- Kathleen Quigly (1888–1981), Irish glass artist and painter

== See also ==
- Quigley
