= John Quigley =

John Quigley may refer to:

- John Quigley (author) (1925–2021), Scottish novelist
- John B. Quigley (born 1940), professor of law at the Ohio State University and writer
- John Quigley (politician) (born 1948), lawyer and member of the Western Australian Legislative Assembly
- John Quigley (hurler) (born 1949), former Irish sportsperson who played hurling
- John Quigley (Pennsylvania official), Pennsylvania Secretary of Environmental Protection
- John Quigley (producer), American film director, producer, editor, and writer
- John Quigley (rower), Australian rower
- Johnny Quigley (1935–2004), Scottish footballer for Nottingham Forest
