= Branstetter =

Branstetter is a surname. Notable people with the surname include:

- Jennifer Branstetter, American Secretary of Planning and Policy of Pennsylvania
- Kent Branstetter (born 1949), American football player
- Lance Branstetter, American guitarist who was part of Mutha's Day Out
- Olin Branstetter (1929–2011), American businessman and politician
- Otto Branstetter (1877–1924), American socialist

== See also ==
- Brandstätter
- Brandstetter
- Branstetter Rocks, a rock formation of Princess Elizabeth Land, Antarctica
- Jane Branstetter Stranch (born 1953), United States Circuit Judge
- Site of Ferdinand Branstetter Post No. 1, American Legion
