= 2004 United States Senate election in Pennsylvania =

- November 2, 2004
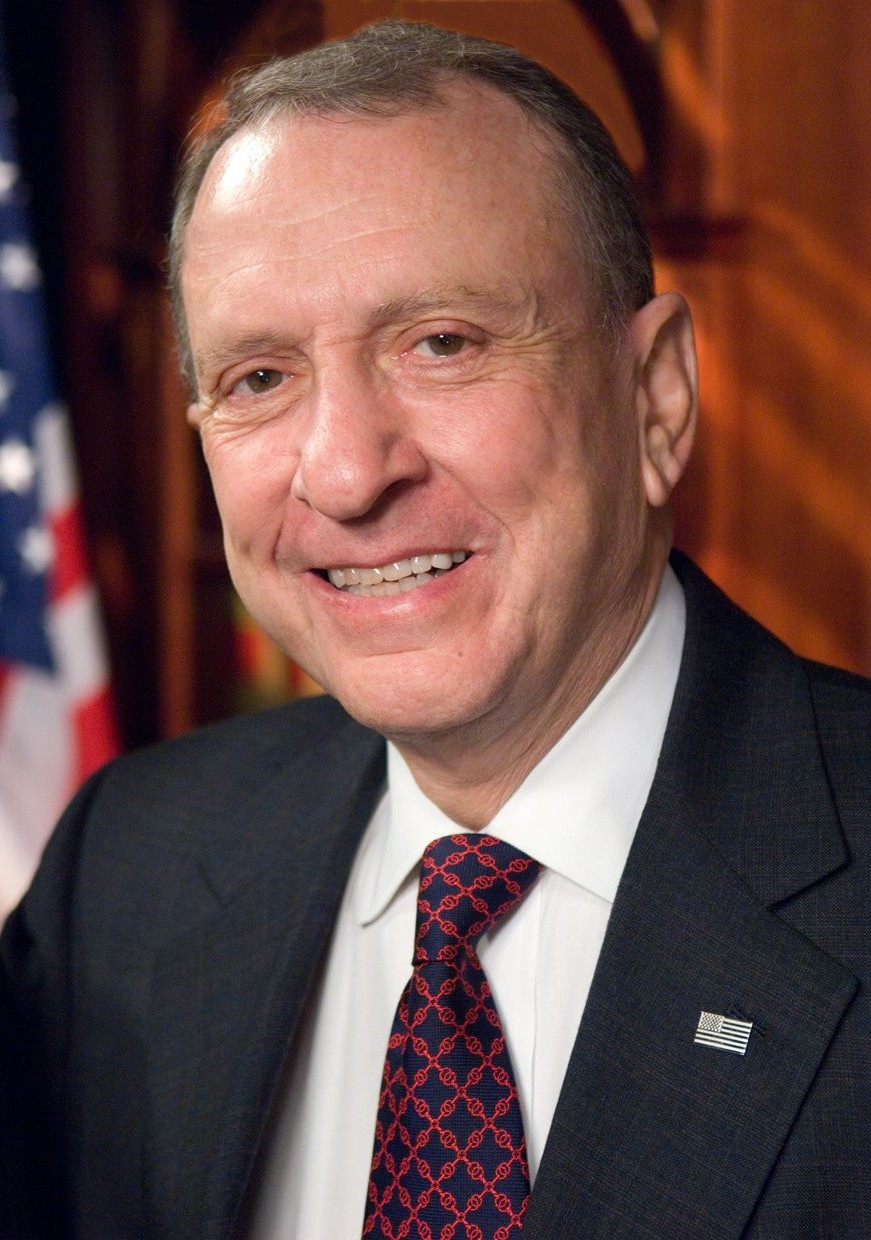

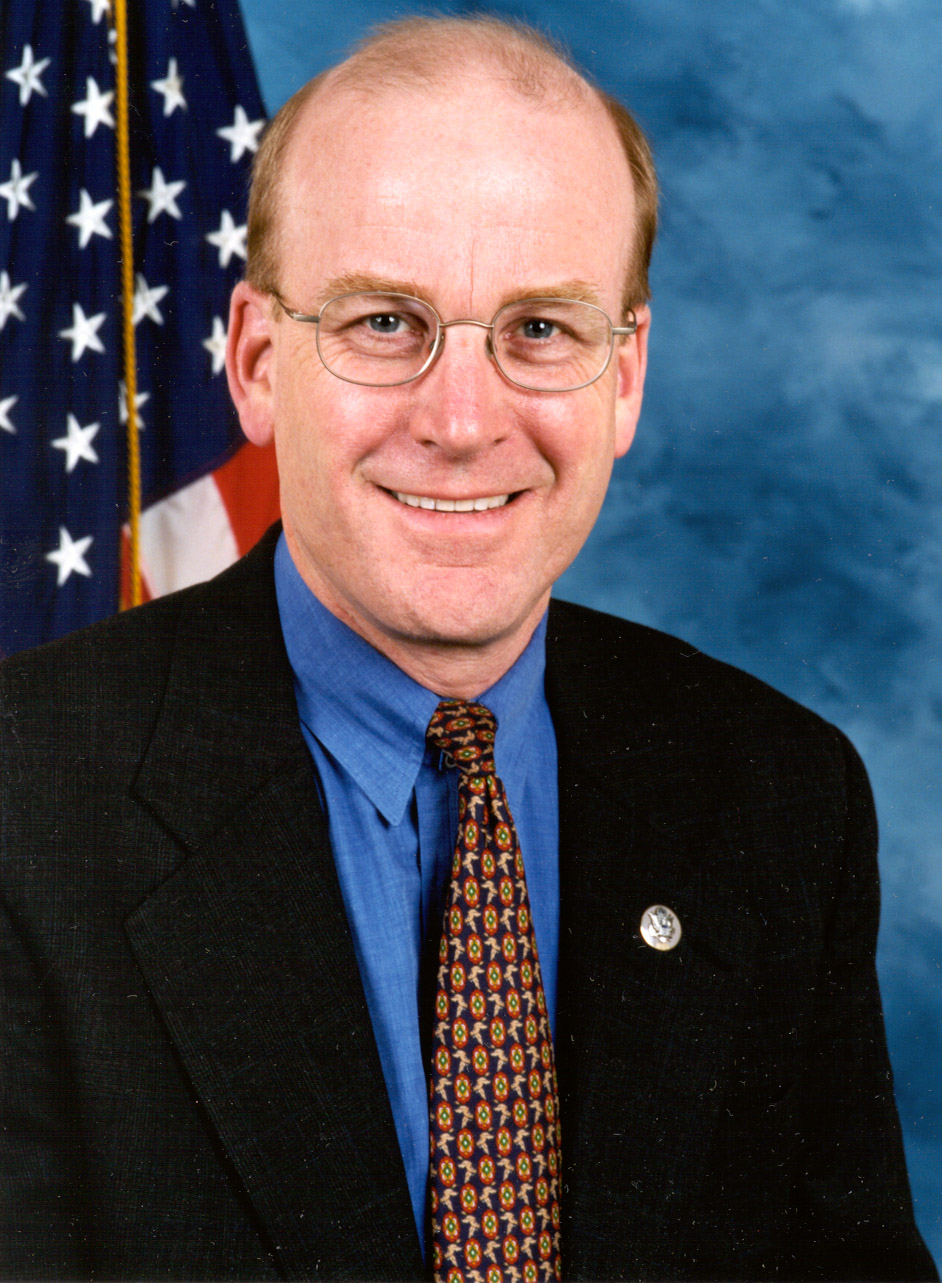
Nominee	Arlen Specter	Joe Hoeffel
Party	Republican	Democratic
Popular vote	2,925,080	2,334,126
Percentage	52.62%	41.99%
- County results Specter: 40–50% 50–60% 60–70% 70–80% Hoeffel: 40–50% 70–80%
U.S. senator before election
Arlen Specter
Republican
Elected U.S. Senator
Arlen Specter
Republican

The 2004 United States Senate election in Pennsylvania was held on November 2, 2004. Incumbent Republican Senator Arlen Specter won re-election to a fifth term. As of 2026, this is the last time a Republican statewide candidate won Montgomery and Delaware Counties and won more than 25% of the vote in Philadelphia. Specter later lost renomination in 2010 as a Democrat, having joined the party in April 2009. Specter’s party switch marked the first time since 1947 that Democrats held both of Pennsylvania’s U.S. Senate seats.

== Democratic primary ==
=== Campaign ===
Democrats had difficulty recruiting top tier candidates against the popular Specter. Among the Democrats to decline to run for the nomination were Treasurer (and former Republican) Barbara Hafer, Public Utilities Commissioner John Hanger, real estate mogul Howard Hanna, State Representative (and also former Republican) John Lawless, and State Senator (and future Congresswoman) Allyson Schwartz.

Congressman Hoeffel ended up running unopposed for the Democratic nomination. Software businessman Charlie Crystle was considered a strong possible candidate, but he dropped out before the election.

=== Results ===
Democratic Party primary for Pennsylvania Senate Election
Party	Candidate	Votes	%
Democratic	Joe Hoeffel	595,816	100.00%

== Republican primary ==
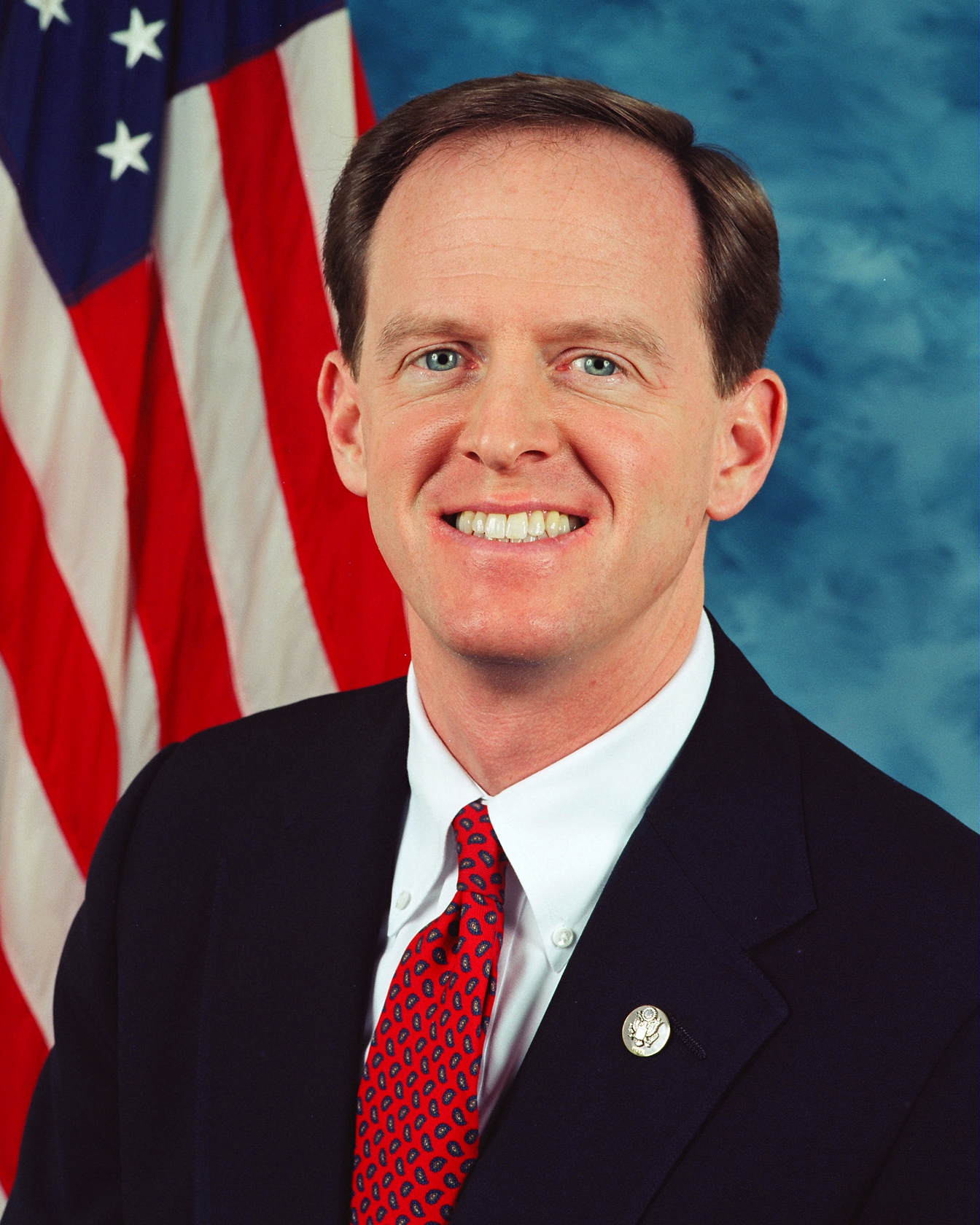
Pat Toomey

=== Campaign ===
Specter faced a primary challenge from Representative Pat Toomey. Despite the state Republican Party's strong history of embracing a moderate philosophy, the influence of conservatism among rank-and-file members had been steadily growing for decades; because of his liberal social views, Specter was often considered to be a "Republican in Name Only" by the right. Although Specter had a huge fundraising advantage, Toomey was aided by $2 million of advertising from the Club for Growth, a conservative political action committee that focuses on fiscal issues and targets moderate Republican incumbents. Toomey criticized Specter as a spendthrift on economic policy and as out of touch with his own party on social issues. Although Toomey had difficulty with name recognition early in the campaign, he built huge momentum over the final weeks preceding the primary, and Specter appeared to have transitioned from having a comfortable lead to being behind his challenger.

Specter received a huge boost from the vocal support of President George W. Bush; most of the state's Republican establishment also closed ranks behind Specter. This included Pennsylvania's other U.S. Senator, Rick Santorum, who was noted for his social conservative views. Many Republicans at the state and national level feared that if Toomey beat Specter, he wouldn't be able to defend the seat against his Democratic opponent.

=== Polling ===
Poll source	Date(s) administered	Sample size	Margin of error	Arlen Specter	Pat Toomey	Undecided
SurveyUSA	April 23–25, 2004	478 (LV)	± 4.6%	48%	48%	4%
Quinnipiac University	April 20–24, 2004	617 (LV)	± 4%	48%	42%	10%
the polling company, inc. (R)	April 22–23, 2004	500 (LV)	± 4.5%	46%	39%	15%
Franklin & Marshall College	April 13–20, 2004	401 (RV)	± 4.8%	50%	26%	24%
Franklin & Marshall College	April 13–20, 2004	126 (LV)	± 8.7%	46%	40%	14%
SurveyUSA	April 17–19, 2004	479 (LV)	± 4.6%	50%	44%	6%
Quinnipiac University	April 12–18, 2004	431 (LV)	± 4.7%	49%	44%	7%
SurveyUSA	April 3–5, 2004	490 (LV)	± 4.5%	46%	40%	14%
Quinnipiac University	Mar 30–Apr 5, 2004	615 (LV)	± 4%	52%	37%	11%
Franklin & Marshall College	March 25–29, 2004	258 (RV)	± 6%	50%	28%	22%
Franklin & Marshall College	March 25–29, 2004	193 (LV)	± 7%	46%	33%	21%
SurveyUSA	March 13–15, 2004	399 (LV)	± 5%	47%	38%	15%
the polling company, inc. (R)	March 9–10, 2004	500 (LV)	± 4.5%	47%	37%	16%
Franklin & Marshall College	February 19–22, 2004	176 (RV)	± 7.3%	55%	17%	28%
the polling company, inc. (R)	January 2004	500 (LV)	± 4.5%	51%	28%	21%
Muhlenberg College	Nov 23–Dec 8, 2003	193 (V)	± 7%	52%	25%	23%
Franklin & Marshall College	Oct 27–Nov 16, 2003	257 (RV)	± 6%	49%	18%	33%

=== Results ===
Results by county Specter: 50–60%; 60–70%; Toomey: 50–60%; 60–70%

The results were much closer than analysts expected, with Specter narrowly winning by a margin of 1.64%. Specter's percentage of the vote was spread evenly across the state, and he received the most votes in the suburban counties of Montgomery, Chester, and Delaware.

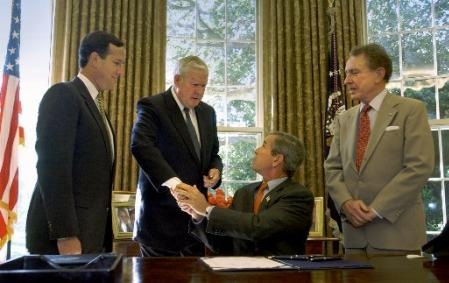
Many analysts attributed Specter's narrow win to support from the Republican establishment, specifically President George W. Bush and Senator Rick Santorum.

Meanwhile, Toomey dominated in his home region of the Lehigh Valley, which he represented as a congressman from Allentown, winning Lehigh and Northampton by wide margins. Toomey also did well in Western Pennsylvania and Metro Pittsburgh, where suburban voters (who turned out the most in primaries) tended to be more socially conservative.

Republican Party primary for Pennsylvania United States Senate election, 2004
Party	Candidate	Votes	%
Republican	Arlen Specter (incumbent)	530,839	50.82%
Republican	Pat Toomey	513,693	49.18%
Total votes		1,044,532	100.00%

Source: PA Department of State - 2004 General Primary

== General election ==
=== Candidates ===
Major

- Joe Hoeffel (D), U.S. Representative
- Arlen Specter (R), incumbent U.S. Senator

Minor

- Jim Clymer (C)
- Betsy Summers (L)

=== Campaign ===
For Democrats, hope of winning the election centered on Toomey's defeat of Specter. However, after the challenge from the right failed, enthusiasm from the party establishment waned and Hoeffel had difficulty matching the name recognition and fundraising power of his opponent Despite contempt from conservatives, Specter enjoyed high levels of support from independent voters and, as in previous elections, a surprisingly large crossover from Democratic voters. Even in the areas in which Toomey performed best in the Republican primary (mainly the state's conservative, rural center), Specter performed well. Except for his large margin of victory in almost uniformly Democratic Philadelphia, Hoeffel was crushed at the polls; his only other wins came by close margins in three metro Pittsburgh counties; although President Bush proved to be unpopular in the state, voters were not willing to abandon Specter over party affiliation. Incidentally, Toomey was elected to the seat in 2010, after Specter switched to the Democratic Party in 2009 and subsequently lost renomination to U.S. Congressman and former Navy Admiral Joe Sestak.

=== Predictions ===
Source	Ranking	As of
Sabato's Crystal Ball	Safe R	November 1, 2004

=== Polling ===
Poll source	Date(s) administered	Sample size	Margin of error	Arlen Specter (R)	Joel Hoeffel (D)	Jim Clymer (C)	Betsy Summers (L)	Undecided
SurveyUSA	Oct 31–Nov 1, 2004	650 (LV)	± 3.9%	53%	35%	8%		4%
Strategic Vision (R)	October 29–31, 2004	801 (LV)	± 3%	55%	33%	4%		8%
Quinnipiac University	October 27–31, 2004	1,022 (LV)	± 3.1%	53%	33%	7%		7%
Zogby International	October 27–30, 2004	601 (LV)	± 4.1%	54%	31%			15%
Zogby International	October 26–29, 2004	602 (LV)	± 4.1%	57%	28%			15%
Zogby International	October 25–28, 2004	603 (LV)	± 4.1%	53%	30%			17%
Strategic Vision (R)	October 25–27, 2004	801 (LV)	± 3%	55%	35%	4%		6%
Zogby International	October 24–27, 2004	602 (LV)	± 4.1%	55%	29%			16%
Temple University	October 22–27, 2004	1,488 (RV)	± 2.6%	51%	29%	5%	3%	12%
Zogby International	October 23–26, 2004	602 (LV)	± 4.1%	54%	33%			13%
Quinnipiac University	October 22–26, 2004	1,340 (RV)	± 2.7%	52%	29%	6%		13%
Quinnipiac University	October 22–26, 2004	1,340 (RV)	± 2.7%	54%	30%			16%
Quinnipiac University	October 22–26, 2004	909 (LV)	± 3.3%	55%	33%	7%		5%
Quinnipiac University	October 22–26, 2004	909 (LV)	± 3.3%	60%	34%			6%
SurveyUSA	October 23–25, 2004	797 (LV)	± 3.5%	51%	38%	6%		5%
Zogby International	October 22–25, 2004	602 (LV)	± 4.1%	53%	35%			12%
Zogby International	October 21–24, 2004	603 (LV)	± 4.1%	48%	38%			14%
Franklin & Marshall College	October 19–23, 2003	622 (RV)	± 3.9%	52%	29%	4%	2%	13%
Franklin & Marshall College	October 19–23, 2003	376 (LV)	± 5.1%	52%	31%			17%
Mason-Dixon	October 19–21, 2004	800 (LV)	± 3.5%	50%	32%	7%		11%
Quinnipiac University	October 16–20, 2004	1,185 (RV)	± 2.9%	49%	33%	5%		13%
Quinnipiac University	October 16–20, 2004	1,185 (RV)	± 2.9%	52%	34%			14%
Quinnipiac University	October 16–20, 2004	841 (LV)	± 3.4%	51%	36%	6%		7%
Quinnipiac University	October 16–20, 2004	841 (LV)	± 3.4%	55%	37%			8%
Strategic Vision (R)	October 17–19, 2004	801 (LV)	± 3%	54%	35%	4%		7%
SurveyUSA	October 15–17, 2004	608 (LV)	± 4.1%	48%	41%	6%		5%
Quinnipiac University	October 9–11, 2004	1,980 (RV)	± 2.2%	51%	33%			16%
Quinnipiac University	October 9–11, 2004	1,343 (LV)	± 2.7%	55%	36%			9%
Strategic Vision (R)	October 9–11, 2004	801 (LV)	± 3%	52%	33%	3%		12%
SurveyUSA	October 3–5, 2004	767 (LV)	± 3.6%	54%	35%			11%
Franklin & Marshall College	Sep 30–Oct 4, 2003	594 (RV)	± 4%	46%	32%	6%		16%
Strategic Vision (R)	September 27–29, 2004	801 (LV)	± 3%	53%	33%	3%		11%
Mason-Dixon	September 27–28, 2004	625 (RV)	± 4%	53%	31%			16%
Quinnipiac University	September 22–26, 2004	1,125 (RV)	± 2.9%	52%	33%			15%
Quinnipiac University	September 22–26, 2004	726 (LV)	± 3.6%	56%	37%			7%
Strategic Vision (R)	September 13–15, 2004	801 (LV)	± 3%	52%	33%	4%		11%
Franklin & Marshall College	September 8–15, 2003	491 (RV)	± 4.4%	51%	25%	5%		19%
Quinnipiac University	September 11–14, 2004	1,205 (RV)	± 2.8%	51%	33%			16%
Quinnipiac University	September 11–14, 2004	792 (LV)	± 3.5%	52%	37%			11%
SurveyUSA	September 7–9, 2004	684 (LV)	± 3.8%	51%	33%			16%
Strategic Vision (R)	August 26–28, 2004	801 (LV)	± 3%	51%	31%	4%		14%
Pew Research	August 13–21, 2004	1,006 (RV)	± 3%	54%	36%			10%
Pew Research	August 13–21, 2004	861 (LV)	± 4%	56%	36%			8%
Strategic Vision (R)	August 16–18, 2004	801 (LV)	± 3%	49%	32%	3%		16%
Quinnipiac University	August 11–16, 2004	1,430 (RV)	± 2.6%	48%	33%			19%
Franklin & Marshall College	August 2–15, 2003	660 (RV)	± 3.8%	53%	26%	2%		19%
SurveyUSA	Jul 31–Aug 2, 2004	740 (LV)	± 3.7%	49%	34%			17%
Quinnipiac University	July 6–11, 2004	1,577 (RV)	± 2.5%	51%	36%			13%
Quinnipiac University	June 21–22, 2004	839 (RV)	± 3.4%	50%	35%			15%
Neighborhood Research (C)	June 7–16, 2004	631 (LV)	± 3.9%	52%	23%	2%		23%
SurveyUSA	June 7–9, 2004	679 (LV)	± 3.8%	58%	33%			9%
Quinnipiac University	May 24–25, 2004	701 (RV)	± 3.7%	49%	37%			14%
Quinnipiac University	March 9–15, 2004	1,022 (RV)	± 3.1%	45%	29%			26%
Quinnipiac University	February 10–16, 2004	1,356 (RV)	± 2.7%	50%	31%			19%
Quinnipiac University	December 11–14, 2003	1,092 (RV)	± 3%	50%	32%			18%
Franklin & Marshall College	Oct 27–Nov 16, 2003	593 (RV)	± 4%	47%	25%			28%
Quinnipiac University	October 9–13, 2003	1,116 (RV)	± 2.9%	50%	33%			17%
Quinnipiac University	Jul 30–Aug 4, 2003	1,037 (RV)	± 3%	53%	29%			18%
DSCC (D)	June 10–12, 2003	500 (LV)	± 4.4%	53%	26%			21%

=== Endorsements ===
Joe Hoeffel (D)

Newspapers

- Philadelphia Daily News
- Times Leader
Arlen Specter (R)

Newspapers

- The Citizens' Voice
- The Evening Sun
- The Indiana Gazette
- Intelligencer Journal
- Lancaster New Era
- Lebanon Daily News
- The Morning Call
- The Patriot-News
- New Pittsburgh Courier
- The Philadelphia Inquirer
- The Scranton Times and The Tribune
- The Sentinel
- York Daily Record

=== Results ===
General election results
Party	Candidate	Votes	%
Republican	Arlen Specter (incumbent)	2,925,080	52.62%
Democratic	Joe Hoeffel	2,334,126	41.99%
Constitution	Jim Clymer	220,056	3.96%
Libertarian	Betsy Summers	79,263	1.43%
Total votes		5,769,590	100.00%
Republican hold			

Source: Election Statistics - Office of the Clerk of the House of Representatives

==== Counties that flipped from Republican to Democratic ====
- Alleghany (largest city: Pittsburgh)
- Beaver (largest city: Beaver)
- Fayette (largest borough: Uniontown)

==== Counties that flipped from Democratic to Republican ====
- Somerset (largest city: Somerset)

== See also ==
- 2004 United States Senate elections
