= Johann Reinhard Blum =

German mineralogist (1802–1883)

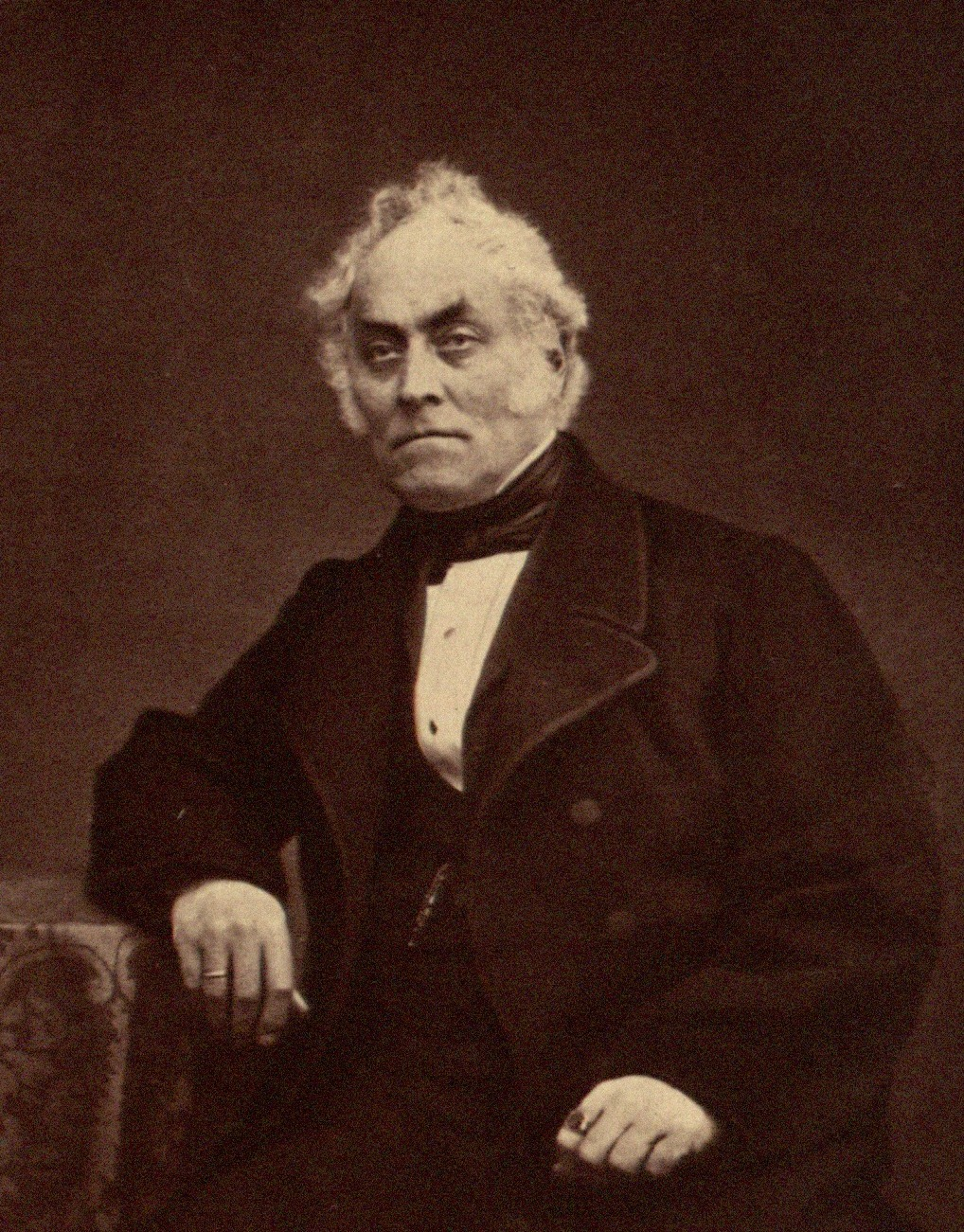
Johann Reinhard Blum, c. 1860

Johann Reinhard Blum (28 October 1802, Hanau – 21 August 1883, Heidelberg) was a German mineralogist.

From 1821 he studied at the universities of Heidelberg and Marburg, receiving his habilitation for mineralogy in 1828. In 1838 he became an associate professor, and in 1856, a full professor of mineralogy at the University of Heidelberg. For many years he was director of the university's mineral collection. In 1871 he was a founding member of the Oberrheinischen Geologischen Vereins (Upper Rhine Geological Association).

He is best remembered for his pioneer research of pseudomorphs, and was the author of a landmark textbook on the subject, titled "Die Pseudomorphosen des Mineralreichs" (1843). In his studies on the origins of pseudomorphs he was among the first to demonstrate the significance of chemistry in several pseudomorphic processes. In 1861 he described the mineral rösslerite, named in honor of its discoverer, Karl Rössler. With chemist Friedrich Wilhelm Hermann Delffs, he described leonhardite, a name given for a partially dehydrated, opaque laumontite. He was elected as a member to the American Philosophical Society in 1882.

== Selected works ==
- Lehrbuch der Oryktognosie, 1832 – Textbook of oryctognosy (a former name for mineralogy).
- Taschenbuch der Edelsteinkunde für Mineralogen, Techniker und Juweliere (as editor, 1834) – Gemology for mineralogists, technicians and jewelers.
- Lithurgik, oder Mineralien und Felsarten, 1840 (a detailed economic mineralogy).
- Die Pseudomorphosen des Mineralreichs, 1843 – Pseudomorphs of the mineral kingdom; Blum's magnum opus.
- Die Einschlüsse von Mineralien in Krystallisirten Mineralien, 1854 – The inclusions of minerals in crystallized minerals.
- Handbuch der lithologie oder gesteinlehre, 1860 – Handbook of lithology.
- Dritter Nachtrag zu den Pseudomorphosen des Mineralreichs, 1863 – Third addendum on pseudomorphs of the mineral kingdom.
- Die mineralien nach den krystallsystemen geordnet, 1866 – Minerals according to the ordered crystal system.
