= Hajo Herrmann =

Luftwaffe pilot and lawyer (1913-2010)

Hans-Joachim Herrmann
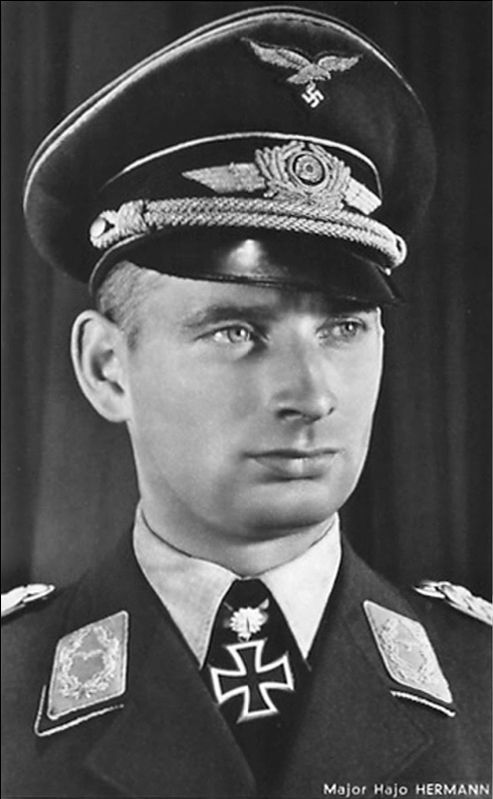
- Hajo Herrmann in January 1944
- Born: 1 August 1913; Kiel, Kingdom of Prussia, German Empire
- Died: 5 November 2010 (aged 97); Düsseldorf, Germany
- Spouse: Ingeborg Reichelt
- Relatives: Thilo Martinho (son)
- Military career
- Allegiance: Nazi Germany
- Branch: Luftwaffe
- Service years: 1935–1945
- Rank: Oberst (colonel)
- Nickname: Hajo
- Units: KG 4, KG 30, JG 300
- Conflicts: Spanish Civil War World War II: Battle of Britain; Balkans Campaign
- Awards: Knight's Cross of the Iron Cross with Oak Leaves and Swords
- Other work: Lawyer

Hans-Joachim "Hajo" Herrmann (1 August 1913 – 5 November 2010) was a World War II Luftwaffe pilot and officer and was awarded the Knight's Cross of the Iron Cross with Oak Leaves and Swords.

After the war, Hermann spent 10 years in Soviet custody as a prisoner of war. Following his release, he became a Nazi activist and lawyer whose high-profile cases included the defence of neo-Nazis and genocide deniers while simultaneously promoting denial and the movement's organisations.

== Early life and career ==
On 1 May 1933, Herrmann joined the Hamburg Landespolizei (state police) and attended the Prussian higher police school in Potsdam-Eiche. Following graduation, he was promoted to Polizei-Leutnant (police second lieutenant) on 1 June 1935. He then joined the military service of the Wehrmacht, initially serving with Infanterie-Regiment 47 (47th Infantry Regiment), a regiment of the 20th Infantry Division. On 1 August 1935, Herrmann transferred to the newly formed Luftwaffe (air force). He then attended the bomber pilot school at Kitzingen Airfield. Following flight training, he was posted to 9. Staffel (9th squadron) of Kampfgeschwader 253 (KG 253—253rd Bomber Wing), a unit which later became Kampfgeschwader 4 "General Wever" (KG 4—4th Bomber Wing), based at Nordhausen.

From 1936 until 1937, Herrmann served in Condor Legion during the Spanish Civil War, travelling on the Usaramo to Cádiz in early August 1936. One of his initial tasks in Spain included developing instructions and training for the usage of the 2 cm Flak 30 anti-aircraft artillery. In this capacity, Herrmann held training sessions in the evening for Nationalist forces after he had flown daytime shuttle missions for the Spanish Army of Africa from Spanish Morocco to Spain, these missions became known as Operation Magic Fire (Feuerzauber). He then flew a Heinkel He 111 B bombers with 1. Staffel of Kampfgruppe 88 (K/88—88th Bomber Group). Herrmann flew 50 combat missions over Spain and following his return to Germany, he was posted to 7. Staffel of KG 4 and appointed Technischer Offizier (TO—Technical Officer). On 1 June 1938, he was promoted to Oberleutnant (first lieutenant). For his service during the Spanish Civil War, he was awarded the Spanish Cross in Gold with Swords (Spanienkreuz in Gold mit Schwertern) on 14 April 1939.

== World War II ==
World War II in Europe began on Friday 1 September 1939 when German forces invaded Poland. Herrmann flew 18 combat missions on the He 111 over Poland, including missions against Polish forces fighting in the Battle of Kutno, and received the Iron Cross 2nd Class (Eisernes Kreuz zweiter Klasse) in October. On 31 May 1940 during the Battle of Dunkirk, he was shot down by Royal Air Force (RAF) fighters, resulting in a crash landing of his Junkers Ju 88 A-1 on the German held beaches near Dunkirk. On 20 June 1940, he was appointed Staffelkapitän (squadron leader) of 7. Staffel of KG 4 and took part in the Battle of Britain. He sank 70,000 tons of Allied shipping as a bomber pilot, and was instrumental in the attack upon Convoy PQ 17.

In February 1941 his group was transferred to Sicily, from where it attacked Malta then fought in the Battle of Greece. In one attack Herrmann sank the ammunition ship Clan Fraser in the Port of Piraeus. The explosion sank 11 ships and made the Greek port unusable for many months.

In July 1942 he was assigned to the general staff in Germany, where he became a confidant of Luftwaffe commander Hermann Göring. In 1942 Herrmann was appointed to the Oberkommando der Luftwaffe (OKL—High Command of the Air Force) staff.

=== The night air war ===
A map of part of the Kammhuber Line. The 'belt' and night fighter 'boxes' are shown.

Following the 1939 aerial Battle of the Heligoland Bight, Royal Air Force (RAF) attacks shifted to the cover of darkness, initiating the Defence of the Reich campaign. By mid-1940, Generalmajor (Brigadier General) Josef Kammhuber had established a night air defense system dubbed the Kammhuber Line. It consisted of a series of control sectors equipped with radars and searchlights and an associated night fighter. Each sector named a Himmelbett (canopy bed) would direct the night fighter into visual range with target bombers. In 1941, the Luftwaffe started equipping night fighters with airborne radar such as the Lichtenstein radar. This airborne radar did not come into general use until early 1942. However, the Himmelbett system had its deficiencies, a dense "bomber stream", crossing the Luftwaffe aerial defenses in narrow area would saturate the Himmelbett boxes. On the night of 30/31 May 1942, RAF Bomber Command for the first time had used the "bomber stream" tactic in Operation Millennium, the thousand-bomber raid on Cologne. Herrmann, who red Kammhuber's reports, became increasingly concerned with the lack of preparation of OKL. He realized that the Luftwaffe would have to fight under conditions of numerical inferiority. Additionally, Herrmann knew that the Himmelbett was costly and susceptible to counter measures. Although not a new idea, he proposed to operate single-seat day fighters in addition to the night fighter force. In November 1942, Herrmann presented his ideas at a meeting of the night fighter staff. Initially, his views were rejected. By March 1943, Herrmann had managed to secure a Focke-Wulf Fw 190 fighter at Berlin-Staaken airfield and flew several training missions in mock combat against a Heinkel He 111 bomber. Encouraged by his experiments, Herrmann approached Generaloberst Hubert Weise, the commander of Luftwaffen-Befehlshaber Mitte (Luftwaffe Commander Central), asking support for a real intercept mission. Specifically, he asked if the anti-aircraft artillery could be restricted to firing to a height of 6,000 meters (20,000 feet). Weise rejected the ask but had no objections if Herrmann was willing to risk flying into a barrage of shell bursts. In April, Herrmann put his ideas to the test when Himmelbett detection reported a De Havilland Mosquito bomber heading for Berlin. He managed to intercept the illuminated Mosquito near Brandenburg an der Havel but failed to shoot it down.

On 22 April, Herrmann was authorized to setup the Nachtjagdversuchskommando (NJVK—Night Fighter Test Detachment) at Brandenburg-Briest which became operational in early May. On 4 May, NJVK was equipped with fourteen aircraft at Brandenburg-Briest, twelve Fw 190As and two Messerschmitt Bf 109G fighters, and two further Fw 190A fighters based at Staaken.

He played a role in the creation of night fighter wing Jagdgeschwader 300 Wilde Sau (Wild Boar) using day fighters at night in response to the night raids of RAF Bomber Command on Germany in mid-1943. As a single seat night fighter he scored 9 victories. On 5 September, Herrmann was injured in a flight accident when his Fieseler Fi 156 Storch C-3 (Werknummer 1297—factory number) suffered engine failure during takeoff at Hennef. On 12 October, Herrmann was again injured when technical malfunction of his Messerschmitt Me 210 A-1 (Werknummer 6019) forced him to make a gear-up landing at Le Bourget Airfield.

In December 1943, Herrmann was appointed Inspector of Night Fighters. By 1944 he was Inspector General of night fighters and received the Knight's Cross with Oak Leaves and Swords. At the end of 1944 he led the 9th Air Division.

Herrmann was a leading exponent of the tactical deployment of Rammjäger Sonderkommando Elbe (ram fighters), sent into action in April 1945. Suicide pilot volunteers, often aged 18 to 20, were to be trained only to be competent enough to control specially lightened and unarmoured Bf 109 fighters and bring down Allied bombers by ramming the tail or control surfaces with the propellers of their aircraft and bailing out if possible. Herrmann's intention was to gather a large number of these fighters for a one-off attack on the USAAF bomber formations in the hope of causing enough losses to curtail the bombing offensive for a few months. Fuel shortages prevented employment of the large numbers necessary, although from one mission of this type, on 7 April 1945, of the 120 fighters thus committed only 15 returned. On 11 May 1945, Herrmann was captured by Soviet forces and held prisoner of war for 10 years and returned to Germany in October 1955.

== Law career and Nazi activism ==
Then he studied law and settled in Düsseldorf. He defended Otto Ernst Remer, the head of the neo-Nazi Socialist Reich Party and the Holocaust deniers David Irving and Fred A. Leuchter. Hermann's affinity for Remer, a committed Nazi and former Wehrmacht officer, was rooted in their mutual Holocaust denial activities. In October 1999 he had another interview with historians Colin Heaton and Jon Guttman. Heaton had been interviewing Herrmann for over ten years.

In 1959 Herrmann married the German soprano Ingeborg Reichelt. The couple had two children.

== Summary of career ==
Herrmann flew 320 combat missions as a bomber pilot including 50 during the Spanish Civil War, sinking twelve ships of approximately 65,000 gross register tons (GRT) of Allied shipping.

=== Aerial victory claims ===
According to Aders, Herrmann was credited with nine nocturnal aerial victories. Foreman, Parry and Mathews, authors of Luftwaffe Night Fighter Claims 1939 – 1945, researched the German Federal Archives and found records for three nocturnal victory claims. Mathews and Foreman also published Luftwaffe Aces — Biographies and Victory Claims, stating Herrmann claimed nine aerial victories.

Chronicle of aerial victories
Claim	Date	Time	Type	Location	Serial No./Squadron No.
– Stab of Kommando Herrmann –
?	4 July 1943	01:30	Lancaster	Bonn-Mehlem	
?	26 July 1943	—	bomber		
?	28 July 1943	—	bomber		
?	31 July 1943	—	four-engined bomber		
?	3 August 1943	01:50	four-engined bomber	vicinity of Hanstedt	Lancaster ED645/No. 103 Squadron RAF
1	24 August 1943	01:30	Lancaster	Berlin vicinity of Mehlen	
– Stab of 30 Jagddivision –
2	3 January 1944	02:57	Lancaster	vicinity of Berlin	
3	3 January 1944	03:05	Lancaster	vicinity of Berlin	

=== Awards ===
- Spanish Cross in Bronze with Swords
- Iron Cross (1939)
  - 2nd Class (October 1939)
  - 1st Class (27 May 1940)
- Honour Goblet of the Luftwaffe (28 September 1940)
- German Cross in Gold on 5 June 1942 as Hauptmann in the III./Kampfgeschwader 30
- Knight's Cross of the Iron Cross with Oak Leaves and Swords
  - Knight's Cross on 13 October 1940 as Oberleutnant and Staffelkapitän of the 7./Kampfgeschwader 4 "General Wever"
  - 269th Oak Leaves on 2 August 1943 as Major and Geschwaderkommodore of Jagdgeschwader 300
  - 43rd Swords on 23 January 1944 as Oberst and Inspekteur der deutschen Luftverteidigung (Note: According to Scherzer as Inspekteur der Nachtjagd in the Reichsluftfahrtministerium and commander of the 30. Jagd-Division.)

=== Dates of rank ===
Hamburg Landespolizei
1 June 1935:	Polizei-Leutnant (second lieutenant)
Wehrmacht
1 June 1938:	Oberleutnant (first lieutenant)
19 December 1940:	Hauptmann (captain), backdated to 1 December 1940
1 March 1943:	Major (major)
1 August 1943:	Oberstleutnant (lieutenant colonel)
1 December 1943:	Oberst (colonel)

== Publications ==
- Herrmann, Hajo (1984). Bewegtes Leben – Kampf- und Jagdflieger 1935–1945 [Eventful Life – Bomber and Fighter Pilot 1935–1945] (in German). Stuttgart, Germany: Motorbuch-Verlag. ISBN 978-3-613-01008-6.
- Herrmann, Hajo (1988). Als die Jagd zu Ende war – Mein Flug in die sowjetische Gefangenschaft [When the Hunt was over – My flight into Soviet Captivity] (in German). Munich, Germany: Universitas. ISBN 978-3-8004-1167-2.
- Herrmann, Hajo, ed. (2006). "Supersoldiers" – Die Wehrmacht im Urteil ausländischer Experten ["Supersoldiers" – The Wehrmacht in the Judgement of Foreign Experts] (in German). Munich, Germany: FZ-Verlag. ISBN 978-3-924309-77-0.

== Notes ==
Military offices
Preceded by none	Commander of Jagdgeschwader 300; June 1943 – 26 September 1943	Succeeded by Oberstleutnant Kurd Kettner
Preceded by none	Commander of 30. Jagd-Division; September 1943 – 16 March 1944	Succeeded by disbanded
Preceded by Oberst Günther Lützow	Commander of 1. Jagd-Division; 23 March 1944 – 1 September 1944	Succeeded by Generalleutnant Kurt Kleinrath
Preceded by none	Commander of 9. Flieger-Division (J); 26 January 1945 – 8 May 1945	Succeeded by none
