= Renward Brandstetter =

Swiss philologist and linguist

Renward Brandstetter (29 June 1860 – 17 April 1942) was a Swiss philologist and linguist who published about medieval and modern Swiss German and the older Swiss theatre history and studied the insular Malayo-Polynesian languages (now considered a subgroup of Austronesian languages).

== Work ==
Postcard (1909)

Brandstetter reconstructed the sound system and a preliminary dictionary of what he called "Original Indonesian". In his observations he was the first to develop a theory of Austronesian roots.

He observed that the predominantly disyllabic lexemes of the languages under consideration contain a recurrent -CVC element (or, less often, -CV) which carries a somewhat consistent meaning. He indexed his manuscript lexicons of the principal languages of the region by their root, and then produced a list of hypothetical shared roots by comparing these lists across languages. His conclusions were considered problematic, and little attention was paid by later scholars of the language group, Otto Dempwolff and Otto Dahl, in their reconstructions of the protolanguage.

His papers are collected at the Haus zum Dolder, his library at the Zentral- und Hochschulbibliothek Luzern.

== Selected writings ==
- Ein Prodromus zu einem vergleichenden Wörterbuch der malaio-polinesischen Sprachen für Sprachforscher und Ethnographen. Lucerne, 1906.
- An Introduction to Indonesian linguistics, trans. by C. O. Blagden, 1–65. London: The Royal Asiatic Society, 1916. (collection of four essays)
- Wie Menschen der indonesischen Erde, 11 volumes, Luzerne, 1921-1937

== Literature and bibliography ==
- Renward Brandstetter (1860–1942). Beiträge zum 150. Geburtstag des Schweizer Dialektologen und Erforschers der austronesischen Sprachen und Literaturen. Mit seiner Autobiographie. Ed. by Schweizerische Akademie der Geistes- und Sozialwissenschaften. Berne, 2012 (Sprache und Kulturen). ISBN 978-3-905870-27-5 [also containing a complete bibliography of Brandstetter's publications.]
- Blust, Robert & Schneider, Jürg (edd.): A World of Words. Revisiting the Work of Renward Brandstetter (1860–1942) on Lucerne and Austronesia. Wiesbaden 2012 (Frankfurter Forschungen zu Südostasien 8).
