= Pennsylvania Department of Environmental Protection =

Agency in the U.S. state of Pennsylvania

- Logo of the DEP

Agency overview
- Formed: July 1, 1995; 31 years ago
- Preceding agency: Department of Environmental Resources
- Jurisdiction: State government of Pennsylvania
- Headquarters: Rachel Carson State Office Building, Harrisburg, Pennsylvania, U.S.; 40°15′45″N 76°52′46.5″W
- Agency executive: Jess Shirley, Secretary of Environmental Protection
- Website: www.dep.pa.gov

The Pennsylvania Department of Environmental Protection (DEP) is the agency in the U.S. state of Pennsylvania responsible for protecting and preserving the land, air, water, and public health through enforcement of the state's environmental laws. It was created by Act 18 of 1995, which split the Department of Environmental Resources into the Department of Environmental Protection and the Department of Conservation and Natural Resources. Its current secretary is Jessica Shirley.

The Department of Environmental Resources was created by Act 275 of 1970, which abolished the Department of Forest and Waters. The Department of Forest and Waters was created by the General Assembly in 1901.

The Department of Environmental Protection is charged with the responsibility for development of a balanced ecological system incorporating social, cultural, and economic needs of the commonwealth through development and protection. The department is responsible for the state's land, air, and water management programs, all aspects of environmental protection, and the regulation of mining operations.

== Structure ==
=== Office of the Secretary ===
The secretary of Environmental Protection, appointed by the governor and confirmed by the state Senate, heads the department. The secretary is ultimately responsible for all policy and resource allocation decisions. The secretary represents DEP before the legislative branch, those affected by DEP action, and the general public. The secretary also manages the Policy Office, Office of Pollution Prevention and Energy Assistance, the Citizens Advisory Council, Office of Communications, the Environmental Education & Information Center, the Legislative Office, the director of External Affairs, and the Office of Environmental Justice.

=== Executive Deputy Secretary for Administration and Management ===
The executive deputy secretary for Administration and Management provides all Department support services. This executive deputy secretary oversees the bureaus of Office Services, Human Resources, Information Technology, Laboratories, the DEP Grants Center, and the Small Businesses Ombudsman's Office.

=== Executive Deputy Secretary for Programs ===
The executive deputy secretary for Programs is responsible for coordinating department-wide programmatic priorities, policies, and actions within the Office of Waste, Air, Radiation, and Remediation; the Office of Water Management; the Office of Active and Abandoned Mine Operations; the Office of Field Operations; and the Office of Oil and Gas Management. It also oversees the Office of Program Integration and the Environmental Emergency Response Program.

=== Field Operations ===
The six regional offices located in Norristown, Harrisburg, Williamsport, Wilkes-Barre, Pittsburgh, and Meadville provide permitting, inspection, enforcement, and other field services for environmental protection programs. The regional offices are responsible for implementing Department programs through permitting, inspection, enforcement, and other field services for environmental and public health protection; program and technical support to Pennsylvania's 66 conservation districts; and compliance assistance to the regulated community.

=== Oil and Gas Management ===
The deputy secretary for Oil and Gas Management directs, coordinates, and oversees the permitting and regulation of the oil and gas industry within the Commonwealth, and is responsible for the development and administration of the regulation of statewide oil and gas conservation and environmental management programs to facilitate the safe exploration, development, and recovery of Pennsylvania's oil and gas reserves in a manner that will protect the commonwealth's natural resources and the environment. This office regulates oil and gas development and production; plugs abandoned and orphaned wells causing health, safety, and environmental problems; oversees the oil and gas permitting and inspection programs; develops statewide regulations and standards; and conducts training programs for industry. The Bureau of Oil and Gas Planning and Program Management is housed here.

=== Water Programs ===
The deputy secretary for Water Management plans, directs, and coordinates departmental programs associated with the management and protection of the commonwealth's water resources; coordinates policies, procedures, and regulations that influence public water supply withdrawals and quality, sewage facilities planning, point source municipal and industrial discharges, encroachments upon waterways and wetlands, dam safety, earth disturbance activities, and control of stormwater and non-point source pollution; and coordinates the planning, design, and construction of flood protection and stream improvement projects. The bureaus of Conservation and Restoration, Waterways Engineering and Wetlands, Point and Non-Point Source Regulation, and Safe Drinking Water and the Office of Interstate Waters are housed here.

=== Active and Abandoned Mine Operations ===
The deputy secretary for Active and Abandoned Mine Operations is responsible for developing and implementing Pennsylvania's policies and programs for surface and underground coal and industrial mineral mining, mine safety, and the reclamation of abandoned mines. This deputy secretary oversees the bureaus of Mining Programs, District Mining Operations, Mine Safety, and Abandoned Mine Reclamation.

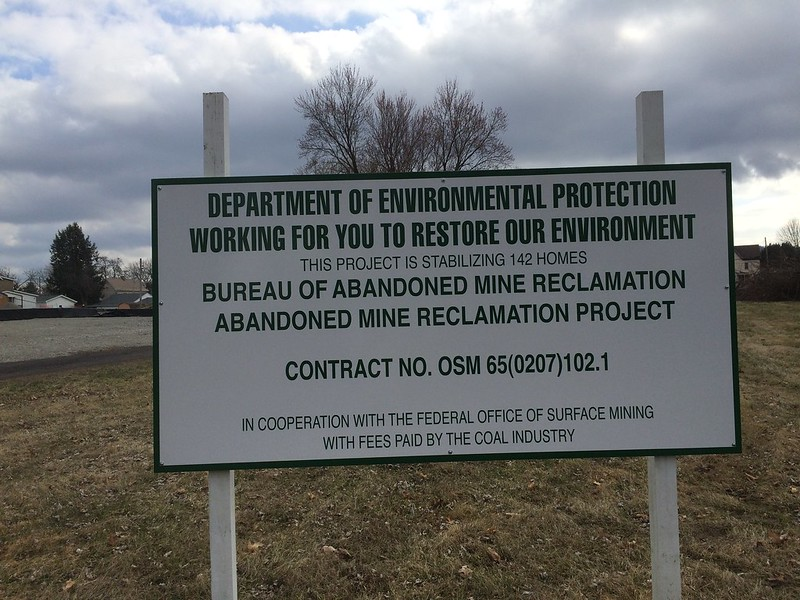
Stabilizing damaged homes in Bradenville, PA.

=== Waste, Air, Radiation, and Remediation ===
The deputy secretary for Waste, Air, Radiation, and Remediation plans, directs and coordinates the department's programs related to air quality, waste management, radiation protection, and environmental cleanup. The bureaus of Waste Management, Radiation Protection, Air Quality, and Environmental Cleanup & Brownfields are housed here.

=== Chief Counsel ===
The chief counsel provides legal representation for all of the Department's programs. The chief counsel oversees the bureaus of Regulatory Counsel, Regional Counsel, General Law, and Investigation.

== Secretaries ==
Name	Dates served	Appointed by
James Seif*	1995–2001	Tom Ridge
David Hess	2001–2003	Tom Ridge
Kathleen McGinty	2003–2008	Edward Rendell
John Hanger	2008–2011	Edward Rendell
Michael Krancer	2011–2013	Tom Corbett
E. Christopher Abruzzo	2013 – October 2, 2014	Tom Corbett
Dana Ankust (acting)	October 2, 2014 – 2015	Tom Corbett
John Quigley	2015–2016	Tom Wolf
Patrick McDonnell	2016–July 2, 2022	Tom Wolf
Ramez Ziadeh (acting)	July 2, 2022 – 2023	Tom Wolf
Rich Negrin*	2023 – December 9, 2023	Josh Shapiro
Jessica Shirley	October 25, 2023 – Present	Josh Shapiro

- *James Seif was also the last Secretary of the Department of Environmental Resources before it was split.
- *Rich Negrin announced his resignation, effective December 9, on October 25, 2023 for medical reasons.

== See also ==
- List of Pennsylvania state agencies
- CONSOL Energy Mine Map Preservation Project

== Bibliography ==
- "Cabinet-level agencies". The Pennsylvania Manual. Vol. 118. Harrisburg, PA: Pennsylvania Department of General Services. 2007. Archived from the original on October 1, 2011.
