= Ingeborg Reichelt =

German soprano singer (1928–2022)

- Born: 11 May 1928; Frankfurt an der Oder, Weimar Republic
- Died: 27 June 2022 (aged 94)
- Occupations: Classical soprano; Academic voice teacher
- Organization: Robert Schumann Hochschule

Ingeborg Reichelt (11 May 1928 – 28 June 2022) was a German soprano singer known for her interpretation of works by Johann Sebastian Bach.

== Biography ==
Reichelt was born in Frankfurt an der Oder studied in Dresden and at the Musikakademie in Hamburg (singing, dancing and acting). She also studied physiology. She graduated as a music teacher in 1950 and passed her concert exam as a pupil of Henny Wolff in 1953.

Reichelt focused on singing oratorios and Lieder. She recorded Bach cantatas with conductors such as Helmuth Rilling, Karl Ristenpart and Kurt Thomas. She was a frequent soloist for the cycle of Bach's cantatas recorded with Fritz Werner conducting the Heinrich-Schütz-Chor Heilbronn and the Pforzheim Chamber Orchestra, including Brich dem Hungrigen dein Brot, BWV 39 with Barbara Scherler and Bruce Abel, a cantata that Bach had written for the first Sunday after Trinity of 1726. In 1957 she recorded Bach's Mass in B minor with Werner and his choir, Helmut Krebs and Franz Kelch.

Her repertoire has also included works of Handel, Haydn, Mozart, Brahms, Hans Pfitzner, Arnold Schoenberg and Hans Werner Henze. She performed with the Beethovenchor Ludwigshafen Bach's Christmas Oratorio in 1957, and Ein deutsches Requiem of Brahms, conducted by Horst Stein in 1967. With the Heinrich-Schütz-Chor, she performed in Handel's Messiah in 1957 and Bach's Christmas Oratorio in 1967. With the Bonner Bach-Gemeinschaft she appeared in Hermann Suter's Le Laudi in 1967 and in Antonín Dvořák's Requiem in 1975. She recorded songs of Igor Stravinsky, Pastorale for soprano, oboe, English horn, clarinet and bassoon, and his orchestration of Two Sacred Songs by Hugo Wolf.

In 1975 she was appointed professor at the Robert Schumann Hochschule in Düsseldorf. Her students have included Mechthild Georg and Andreas Schmidt.

She wrote a book Die Balance im Gesang (Balance in Singing), published by Ricordi in 2004.

From 1959 until his death in 2010, Reichelt was married to the lawyer and former World War II Luftwaffe pilot Hajo Herrmann.

She died on 27 June 2022, at the age of 94.
