= Charlie Crystle =

American businessman

- Known for: Founder of Chili!Soft, GiftWorks

Charlie Crystle is an entrepreneur from Lancaster County, Pennsylvania. He founded the software company Chili!Soft in 1996 and raised startup capital from venture firm Draper Fisher Jurvetsen of Palo Alto, CA.

Chili!Soft was purchased by Cobalt Networks for when Crystle was 32 years old. He used the proceeds to fund several non-profit organizations and projects. The software was incorporated into Sun Microsystems's Sun Java System Web Server.

Crystle entered the 2004 Democratic primary for the U.S. Senate in an attempt to unseat Arlen Specter. Interest in his candidacy, the race was stoked when he told the Associated Press that he would consider spending $1 million of his own money on the race.
