= Jennifer Branstetter =

American politician

Secretary of Planning and Policy of Pennsylvania
- In office January 18, 2011 – January 20, 2015
- Governor: Tom Corbett
- Preceded by: Donna Cooper
- Succeeded by: John Hanger

Personal details
- Education: Washington & Jefferson College

Jennifer Branstetter served as the Secretary of Planning and Policy for the administration of former Pennsylvania Governor Tom Corbett. In that position, she was part of the Governor's "senior staff." As Secretary of Planning and Policy, she manages policy development for the Governor's Office, including energy policy. She also served as the policy director for Governor-elect Corbett's transition team. During Corbett's term as Pennsylvania Attorney General, she was the Director of Education and Outreach.

She serves on the board of governors of the Pennsylvania State System of Higher Education.

She previously worked in the Ridge administration as Deputy Press Secretary and Special Assistant to Lieutenant Governor Mark Schweiker.

In the private sector, she worked as a Communications Coordinator for the Pennsylvania Bar Association.

She is a 1994 graduate of Washington & Jefferson College.
