= Rasmus Vöge =

German politician (born 1979)

Member of the Landtag of Schleswig-Holstein
- Incumbent
- Assumed office 7 June 2022
- Preceded by: Klaus Schlie
- Constituency: Lauenburg-Nord

Personal details
- Born: 26 June 1979 (age 46) Kiel
- Party: Christian Democratic Union (since 1996)

Rasmus Vöge (born 26 June 1979 in Kiel) is a German politician serving as a member of the Landtag of Schleswig-Holstein since 2022. From 2002 to 2010, he served as chairman of the Young Union in Schleswig-Holstein.
