= Citizens for Pennsylvania's Future =

American nonprofit advocacy organization

PennFuture
- Abbreviation: PennFuture
- Formation: 1998; 27 years ago
- Headquarters: Harrisburg, Pennsylvania
- Board Chair: Scott E. Tobe, CAP
- President and CEO: Patrick McDonnell
- Board of directors: Scott E. Tobe, CAP; Ann Foster; Joyce Marin; Stephen McCarter; Suzette Munley; Cecily Kihn; Ellen Lutz; Dr. Jennifer Swann; Michael E. Mann; John L. Vanco; Corey C. Wolff
- Website: https://www.pennfuture.org/

Citizens for Pennsylvania's Future (PennFuture) is a nonprofit environmental advocacy organization based in Harrisburg, Pennsylvania, United States. As of 2021, the organization has five offices across Pennsylvania: Philadelphia, Pittsburgh, Harrisburg, Mt. Pocono and Erie.

== History ==
PennFuture was founded in 1998 with the mission to work to "create a just future where nature, communities and the economy thrive. We enforce environmental laws and advocate for the transformation of public policy, public opinion and the marketplace to restore and protect the environment and safeguard public health. PennFuture advances effective solutions for the problems of pollution, sprawl and global warming; mobilizes citizens; crafts compelling communications; and provides excellent legal services and policy analysis."

In February 2008, Citizens for Pennsylvania's Future announced that Teresa Heinz, Chair of The Heinz Endowments, Rebecca Rimel, President of The Pew Charitable Trusts, and Nobel Peace Prize winner Al Gore would speak at the organization's 10th Anniversary Gala in Philadelphia.

In July 2022, Patrick McDonnell assumed the role of president and CEO of PennFuture. He replaced former president and CEO, Jacquelyn Bonomo.

== Issue stances ==
Some of the policies endorsed by PennFuture include clean energy, air quality, and water quality, and mining. According to PennFuture, "air pollution is shortening lives, contaminating fish, killing streams and forests, and inexorably warming the global climate. Watersheds are thoughtlessly being undermined and paved over, and good water quality is becoming a rare commodity. Thousands of acres of land are defiled by past coal mining, and communities, streams, and families still suffer from destructive mining techniques."

To achieve success in their mission, the organization is "working to replace old outdated dirty sources of power with clean renewable Pennsylvania-made electricity, fighting factory farm pollution, helping to stop damage from mining, protecting watersheds from sprawl and pollution, reducing global warming pollution, watchdogging state government, and providing $2 million per year of free legal services to protect the environment."

== Additional Accomplishments ==
PennFuture has been involved in the passage of the $625 million Growing Greener Bond in 2005, the enactment of the state's Alternative Energy Portfolio Standard mandates, and the enactment of state rules to cut mercury pollution and ease the purchase of "clean" cars. PennFuture also holds frequent campaigns to contact legislators about specific legislation, hosting "Lobbying Days" in the Capitol, and providing pre-written letters for its grassroots activists to send to lawmakers.

PennFuture has received more than $900,000 from alternative energy companies during the past five years, much of which the eco-activist group has used to lobby for tax breaks, subsidies and mandates for the wind and solar industries. Foundations led by the Heinz and Haas families have donated generously.

== Press ==
- 1 February 2007 PennFuture Files Endangered Species Act Petition Against Bush Administration
- 22 May 2007 PennFuture, Environmental Integrity Project Launch Legal Action to Stop Massive Air Pollution from Bruce Mansfield Power Plant
- 18 June 2007 New Poll Shows Overwhelming Support for Energy Independence
- 8 February 2008 PennFuture Lauds Court Decision Striking Down Federal Mercury Rule
- 12 February 2008 PennFuture praises state House for moving Pennsylvania into national leadership with passage of energy savings bill
- 19 August 2008 Jan Jarrett named PennFuture president and CEO as John Hanger becomes Pennsylvania Pennsylvania Department of Environmental Protection (DEP) Secretary
- 22 January 2009 PennFuture offers opportunity for citizen input on global warming plan - Ideas to be shared with Pennsylvania's Climate Change Advisory Committee
- 9 July 2010 PennFuture: Harrisburg's Lobbying Launderers
- 5 March 2012 PennFuture Appoints George Jugovic, Jr. President and CEO
- 4 October 2013 PennFuture seeks to ensure clean water and restore migrating fish to local streams
- 20 November 2013 PennFuture Asks Pennsylvania House Committee To End The Dirty Diesel Loophole
- 25 March 2014 Switching on: Installing LED streetlights to save Pennsylvania taxpayers money
- 24 July 2014 Audit blasts DEP's handling of gas-well industry
- 31 July 2014 Pittsburgh Hosts Hearing on EPA's New Greenhouse Gas Proposals
- 18 August 2014 Environmentalist group says health registry needed
- 21 August 2014 PennFuture Files Second Appeal Over Anadarko Permit in Lycoming County
- 8 October 2014 Despite ups and downs, solar power still shining in Pennsylvania
- 20 November 2014 PennFuture Appeal Settlement Improves DEP Stormwater Management Program
- 15 January 2015 PennFuture calls for state-specific methane regulations
- 16 January 2015 John Quigley: 'There's a real opportunity to get [Marcellus Shale] right'
- 29 January 2015 Wolf bans new gas drilling leases on public land as promised
- 1 April 2015 PennFuture commends proposal to ‘reinvigorate clean energy investments
- 15 April 2015 Environmental Group Estimates State's Fossil-Fuel Subsidies

== Legal Issues ==
- 21 December 2011 PennLive: PennFuture returns more than $138,000 to Pennsylvania because of contract violations
