= Andreas Brandstätter =

German diplomat

Andreas Brandstätter (1958–2006) was a German diplomat.

== Education ==
He was born in Kiel, Germany, in 1958 and raised in Bad Oldesloe, near Hamburg, Germany. Already as a high school student, he developed a strong interest in promoting intercultural understanding and working internationally. He spent a year in the US through Youth For Understanding (YFU), an intercultural exchange program. As an undergraduate, he studied at the University of California at Santa Barbara (UCSB), through the Anglistenprogramm (program for English majors) of the German Academic Exchange Service (DAAD). He attended Georg August University of Göttingen, Germany, from 1978 to 1983, majoring in English and Political Science, and graduating with his Staatsexamen degree in 1983. During that time, he also completed summer internships with the United Nations Development Programme (UNDP). In 1983, he continued his studies at The Fletcher School of Law and Diplomacy of Tufts University, earning his Master of Arts in Law and Diplomacy (MALD) in 1985.

== Career ==
Over the following years, he worked for the United Nations Development Programme in several countries, holding posts as Junior Professional Officer (JPO) in Abidjan, Ivory Coast, and Nairobi, Kenya. He also worked at the UN Headquarters in New York and the UN Office in Geneva, Switzerland. Since 2004 he was on assignment to the United Nations Stabilisation Mission in Haiti (MINUSTAH), serving as Senior Child Protection Adviser. He died in Port-au-Prince, Haiti, on January 7, 2006.

== Work ==
His video-documentary (produced by MINUSTAH) The Lost Children of Cité Soleil describes the situation of children affected by the armed conflict in Cité Soleil. The documentary was included in the 10th United Nations Association Film Festival 2007 and features a short biography of Andreas.
