= Friedrich Wilhelm Hermann Delffs =

German chemist (1812–1894)

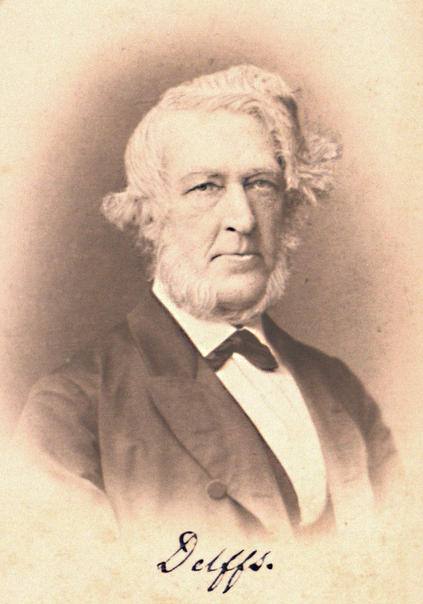
Friedrich Wilhelm Hermann Delffs

Friedrich Wilhelm Hermann Delffs (21 April 1812 in Kiel – 18 March 1894 in Heidelberg) was a German chemist.

He studied natural sciences at the University of Kiel, receiving his doctorate in 1834. In 1840 he obtained his habilitation at the University of Heidelberg, where in 1843 he became an associate professor. From 1853 he was a full professor of chemistry at Heidelberg, being given the status of professor emeritus in 1889. At Heidelberg he gave classes in pharmaceutical, organic and physiological chemistry.

He main research dealt with investigations of uric acid, fumaric acid, oenanthic ether, sorbin, laurin, molybdate of ammonia and alloxan. In 1843, with mineralogist Johann Reinhard Blum, he proposed the name "leonhardite" for partially dehydrated forms of laumontite.

== Published works ==
- Die anorganische Chemie in ihren Grundzügen: dargestellt, 1839 – Inorganic chemistry shown in outline.
- Die organische Chemie in ihren Grundzûgen dargestellt. Kiel, 1840 – Organic chemistry shown in outline.
- Stöchiometrischer Commentar zur Pharmacopoea Badensis, Heidelberg 1842 – Stoichiometric commentary on the Pharmacopoea Badensis.
- Analyse des Leonhardits, in: Poggendorff's Annalen der Physik und Chemie 59, 339-342 – Analysis of leonhardite.
- Siedepunkte, specifische Gewichte und Brechungsexponenten mehrerer organischer Flüssigkeiten, 1853.
- Die reine Chemie in ihren Grundzügen; Erlangen, (3rd edition; 2 volumes, 1854/55) – The pure chemistry: presented in outline.
