= Rose (surname) =

The surname Rose can be of English, Scottish, French, Danish, German, or Jewish origin.

The name Ruskin (Rose + Kin) is derived from Rose.

Notable people with the name include:

- Adam Rose (wrestler) (born 1979), South African professional wrestler
- Adele Rose (1933–2020), English television writer
- A. J. Rose (born 1997), American football player
- Alan Rose (1899–1975), British colonial judge, Chief Justice of Singapore
- Alan Rose (public servant) (born 1944), Australian public servant
- Alec Rose (1908–1991), English nursery owner, fruit merchant and amateur single-handed sailor
- Alfred Lionel Rose (1898–1980), Australian Army colonel, veterinarian and NT public servant
- Alison Rose (1944–2025), American writer and model
- Anika Noni Rose (born 1972), American singer and actress
- Anthony Rose (disambiguation), several people
- Axl Rose (born 1962), American hard rock singer and songwriter
- Barbara Rose (1938–2020), American art historian and critic
- Barry Rose (born 1934), English choir trainer and organist
- Bernard Rose (disambiguation), several people
- Brandon Rose, American football player
- Buddy Rose (1952–2009), American professional wrestler
- Charles Rose (disambiguation), several people, including Charlie Rose
- Christopher Rose (disambiguation), several people, including Chris Rose
- Clan Rose, Scottish clan hailing from the Scottish Highlands
- Clifford Rose (1929–2021), English actor
- Clive Rose (disambiguation), several people
- Cyrille Rose (1830–1902), French clarinetist
- Daniel Rose (disambiguation), several people, including Danny Rose
- Dare Rose (born 2002), American swimmer
- David Rose (disambiguation), several people, including Dave Rose
- Debi Rose, Member of New York City Council
- Derrick Rose (born 1988), American basketball player
- Donald Rose (1914–2025), English World War II veteran and supercentenarian
- Donita Rose (born 1974), American-born Filipino actress and television host
- Dorothy H. Rose (1920–2005), American politician
- Edith Bullock (1903–1994), American businesswoman and politician born Edith Rose
- Edmund Rose (1836–1914), German surgeon
- Eileen Rose, American singer-songwriter
- Eileen Rose (artist) (1909–2003), New Zealand art teacher and artist
- Eileen Rose Busby (1922–2005), American antiques appraiser and writer
- Ellen Alida Rose (1843–?), American agriculturist, suffragist
- Emilio De Rose (1929–2018), Italian dermatologist and politician
- Emily Blathwayt née Rose (1852–1940), British suffragette, mother of Mary Blathwayt; Eagle House home was "Suffragette's Rest", planted trees for hunger strikers
- Erica Rose (swimmer) (born 1982), American long-distance swimmer
- Esther Rose (painter) (1901–1990), American painter, mother of Eileen Rose Busby
- Federico Rose (born 2003), Canadian soccer player
- Felipe Rose (born 1954), American musician, founding member of The Village People
- Fred Rose (politician) (1907–1983), Canadian politician and trade unionist convicted of spying for the Soviet Union
- Frederick P. Rose (1923–1999), American real estate developer
- Gene Rose (American football end) (1913–1986), American football player
- Gene H. Rose (1904–1979), American football player
- George Rose (disambiguation), several people
- Georges Rose (1910–1997), French footballer
- Gideon Rose (born 1964), American magazine editor
- Gillian Rose (1947–1995), English philosopher
- Gillian Rose (geographer) (born 1962), British geographer
- Glenola Rose (1918–1935), American chemist and founder of the Women's Service Committee of the American Chemical Society
- Graham Rose (disambiguation), several people
- Gregory Rose (disambiguation), several people, including Greg Rose
- Gustav Rose (1798–1873), German mineralogist, father of Edmund Rose
- H. J. Rose (1883–1961), British classical scholar
- Hanna T. Rose (1909–1976), American museum curator
- Harald Rose (1935-2026), German physicist
- Harriet Rose (born 1989), English presenter
- Heinrich Rose (1795–1864), German mineralogist, brother of Gustav Rose
- Hellen Rose, musician, performance artist, and filmmaker, wife and collaborator of George Gittoes
- Hilary Rose (disambiguation), several people
- Hilly Rose, American talk radio broadcaster
- Horace Arthur Rose (1867–1933), British civil servant in India and author
- Howie Rose (born 1954), American sports broadcaster
- Hugh Rose, 1st Baron Strathnairn (1801–1885), German-born Irish field marshal of the British army
- Hugh James Rose (1795–1838), English theologian
- Jack Rose (disambiguation), several people
- Jacqueline Rose (born 1949), English academic
- Jacqui Rose, British crime fiction novelist
- Jalen Rose (born 1973), American basketball player and sportscaster
- James Rose (disambiguation), several people
- Jane Rose (dramatist) (1880–1927), Yiddish dramatist and theater activist
- Jessie Rose Innes (1860–1943), nurse and suffragist
- Jim Rose (disambiguation), several people
- John Rose (disambiguation), several people
- Jon Rose (born 1951), English-born Australian violinist
- Jonathan F.P. Rose (born 1952), American real estate developer
- Joseph Nelson Rose (1862–1928), American botanist using the standard author abbreviation "Rose"
- Judd Rose (1955–2000), American journalist, son of Hilly Rose
- Justin Rose (born 1980), English professional golfer
- Karen Rose, American romance novelist
- Kay Rose (1922–2002), American sound editor
- Kevin Rose (disambiguation), several people
- Lachlan Rose, Australian association football player
- Lauchlan Rose, founder of Rose's lime juice
- Larry Rose III (born 1995), American football player
- Lee Rose (disambiguation), several people
- Leonard Rose (1918–1984), American cellist
- Leonard Rose (hacker) (born 1959), American computer hacker
- Lila Rose (born 1988), American anti-abortion activist
- Linwood H. Rose (born 1951), American former university president
- Lionel Rose, Australian boxer
- Lloyd Rose, American novelist
- M. Richard Rose (1933–2021), American academic executive
- Martha Parmelee Rose (1834–1923), American journalist, reformer and philanthropist
- Mauri Rose (1906–1981), American racecar driver, three-time winner of the Indianapolis 500
- Maurice Rose (1899–1945), American World War II army general
- Max Rose (born 1986), US Congressman from New York
- Mercedes Rose (born 1972), American actress
- Mervyn Rose, Australian tennis player
- Mia Rose (born 1988), English singer
- Michael Rose (disambiguation), several people
- Murray Rose (1939–2012), Australian swimmer, medalist in the 1956 and 1960 Olympic Games
- Murray Rose (politician) (1939–2021), New Zealand politician
- Nancy Rose, American economist
- Nectar Rose (born 1974), American actress
- Nikolas Rose (born 1947), British sociologist
- Norman Rose, American actor
- Oren John Rose (1892–1971), American World War I flying ace who served in British and American military forces
- Pamela Rose (1917–2021), British actress and wartime intelligence worker
- Paul Rose (disambiguation), several people
- Pete Rose (1941–2024), American baseball player
- Peter Rose (disambiguation), several people, including other people named Pete Rose
- Quinton Rose (born 1998), American basketball player
- Randy Rose (born 1956), American professional wrestler
- Reginald Rose (1920–2002), American film and television writer
- Richard Rose (disambiguation), several people
- Robert Rose (disambiguation), several people
- Roger Rose (born 1958), American actor
- Romani Rose (born 1946), German Romany activist
- S. L. Rose (1818–1887), American politician and judge in Wisconsin and Iowa
- Seraphim Rose (1934–1982), American Orthodox monk and writer, son of Esther Rose
- Sheena Rose, Caribbean artist
- Solomon Rose (born c. 1987), English electronic musician
- Stephan Rose, Guyanese boxer
- Stephanie Rose (disambiguation), several people
- Steven Rose (1938–2025), English neuroscientist, author, and social commentator, professor of biology and neurobiology, brother of Nikolas Rose
- Stuart Rose (born 1949), British businessman
- Thomas Rose (disambiguation), several people
- Tim Rose (1940–2002), American singer-songwriter
- Tim Rose (American football) (born 1941), American football coach and player
- Timothy M. Rose (born 1956), British actor and puppeteer
- Valentin Rose (disambiguation), several people
- Verona Rose, English television presenter and actress
- Xiaohong Rose Yang, biomedical scientist
- Waldo Rose, American politician
- Wally Rose (1913–97), American jazz musician
- Walter Rose (footballer) (1912–1989), German footballer
- Walter W. Rose, American politician and real estate developer
- Wendy Rose (born 1948), American poet
- Wesley Rose (1918–1990), American music industry executive and record producer
- Whitney Rose (TV personality) (born 1986), American television personality and businesswoman
- Whitney Rose (musician) (born 1986), Canadian-American country musician
- Wickliffe Rose (1862–1931), American public health advocate and administrator
- Wilfred Andrew Rose (1922–2008), Trinidad and Tobago diplomat and politician
- Willi Rose (1902–1978), German actor
- William Rose (screenwriter) (1918–1987), American screenwriter
- William Rose (footballer) (1861–1937), English footballer
- William Rose (illustrator) (1909–1972), American illustrator of film posters
- William Rose (Clerk of the Parliaments) (1803–1885), British Clerk of the Parliaments
- William Rose (cricketer, born 1934), English cricketer
- William Rose (schoolmaster and writer), Scottish schoolmaster, writer and classical scholar
- William Rose (MP for Canterbury) (fl. 1411–1435), English politician
- William Rose (cricketer, born 1842) (1842–1917), English cricketer
- William Anderson Rose (1820–1881), British politician
- William Balthazar Rose (born 1961), English painter
- William Cumming Rose (1887–1985), American biochemist
- William Edward Rose (1813–1893), American businessman and politician
- William G. Rose (1829–1899), American politician
- William I. Rose (United States Army officer) (1898–1954), United States Army general
- William I. Rose (geologist) (1944–2025), American volcanologist
- William John Rose (1885–1968), Canadian historian
- William Kinnaird Rose (1845–1919), Scottish journalist, war correspondent, investigator and editor
- William Oliver Rose (1871–1936), Canadian politician
- William Pinckney Rose (1787–1850), American soldier
- William Stewart Rose (1775–1843), British poet, translator and Member of Parliament
- Willie Rose (born 1987), American football player
- Willie Lee Rose (1927–2018), American historian
- Winston Rose (born 1993), American gridiron football player

== Fictional characters ==
- Amy Rose, a character in the Sonic the Hedgehog franchise
- Johnny, Moira, David, and Alexis Rose, the main characters in the television show Schitt's Creek
- Marie Rose (Dead or Alive), in the Dead or Alive franchise
- Mila Rose, in the manga/anime series Bleach
- Ruby Rose (RWBY character), in the animated web series RWBY

== Distribution ==
In the UK, Rose is the 69th most common surname, with 89,001 bearers. It has the highest concentration in Luton, where it is the most common surname, with 4,858 bearers, and is the most prevalent in Greater London, where it is the 20th most common surname with 11,246 bearers. Other concentrations include, City of Leeds, (11th, 4,840), Surrey (14th, 8,056), Ceredigion, (38th, 1,718), Staffordshire, (55th, 3,298), North Lanarkshire, (94th, 1,666), Essex, (101st, 4,784), South Yorkshire, (101st, 3,212), Belfast, (268th, 1,632), Cardiff, (272nd, 1,618), Bristol, (324th, 1,662), Merseyside, (498th, 1,624), West Yorkshire, (509th, 1,648), Cheshire, (540th, 1,624), Kent, (816th, 1,614), and Lancashire, (843rd, 1,730).

== See also ==
- Rose (disambiguation)
- Rose (given name)
- Rosé (surname)
- Roser (name), given name and surname
- Roos (surname)
- Ríos (disambiguation)
