= Ariane et Barbe-bleue =

Opera by Paul Dukas

- Opera by Paul Dukas
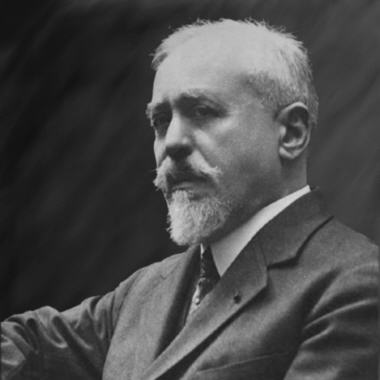
- The composer
- Language: French
- Based on: Ariane et Barbe-bleue by Maurice Maeterlinck
- Premiere: 10 May 1907; Opéra-Comique, Paris

Ariane et Barbe-bleue (French pronunciation: [aʁjan e baʁb blø], Ariadne and Bluebeard) is an opera in three acts by Paul Dukas. The French libretto is adapted (with very few changes) from the symbolist play of the same name by Maurice Maeterlinck, itself loosely based on the French literary tale La Barbe bleue by Charles Perrault.

Dukas had been impressed by Maeterlinck's play when it was first published in 1899. Maeterlinck had initially reserved the rights to use Ariane as a libretto for Edvard Grieg. When Grieg abandoned his plans to compose the opera, Maeterlinck offered it to Dukas instead. Dukas worked on the score between 1899 and 1906.

The work has often been compared to Debussy's opera Pelléas et Mélisande (1902), also based on a Maeterlinck play; Debussy had virtually finished his score by the time Dukas began work on his. The names of Barbe-bleue's five former wives are taken from previous plays by Maeterlinck: Sélysette from Aglavaine et Sélysette (1896), Alladine from Alladine et Palomides (1894), Ygraine and Bellangère from La mort de Tintagiles (1894), and Mélisande from Pelléas et Mélisande. Dukas, who knew Debussy well, actually borrowed three bars from Debussy's opera to accompany the first mention of Mélisande, although the character is minor in Dukas' opera. Ariane takes her name from the legend of Ariadne and the Cretan labyrinth, although she combines the roles of both Ariadne and Theseus, who freed the captive Athenian virgins from the Minotaur just as Ariane liberates—or tries to liberate—the wives from Bluebeard.

It received its first performance at the Opéra Comique in Paris on 10 May 1907. Performances in the latter half of the twentieth century were rare.

== Performance history ==
Ariane et Barbe-bleue was premiered at the Salle Favart in Paris by the Opéra Comique on 10 May 1907 with Maeterlinck's partner, Georgette Leblanc, in the title role. Alexander von Zemlinsky conducted it at the Vienna Volksoper on 2 April 1908. Arnold Schoenberg and his pupils Alban Berg and Anton Webern were in the audience and expressed their admiration for the music. Further performances followed in Brussels (1909), New York and Milan (1911), Buenos Aires (1912) and Madrid (1913).

Shortly after the death of Dukas there was a performance in Amsterdam (1935). The British premiere did not take place until 20 April 1937 (at the Royal Opera House, Covent Garden, London). Oper Frankfurt gave a new production in its 2007–2008 season and Opéra National de Paris took the work to Japan in July 2008, together with only one other full-length opera, on the company's first tour of that country; Gran Teatre del Liceu (Barcelona) gave a new production in June 2011, its premiere at the theatre.

In July 2022, West Edge Opera premiered a new production directed by Alison Pogorelc, which music critic Joshua Kosman wrote, "made the best imaginable case for the work."

== Roles ==
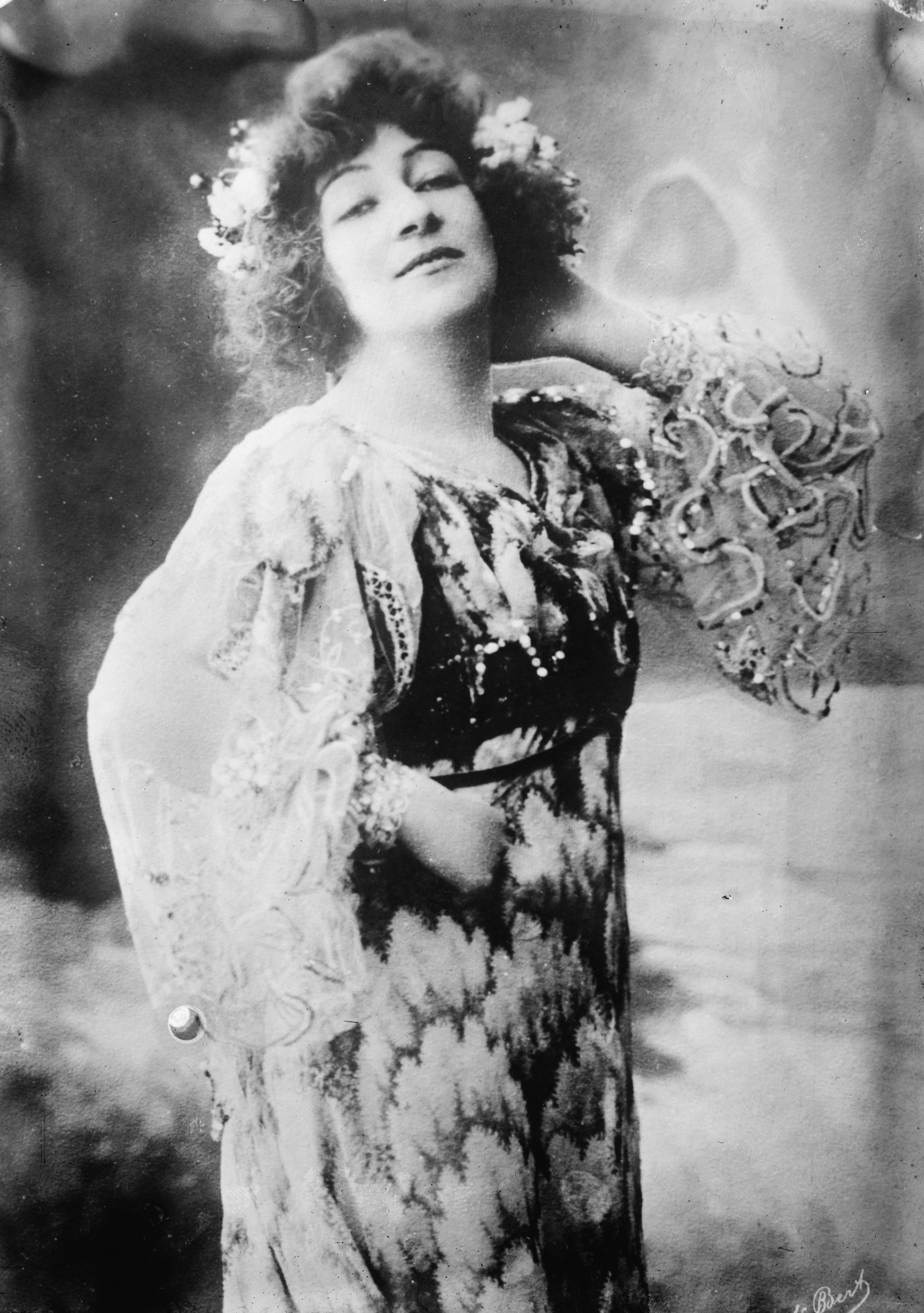
Georgette Leblanc, who created the role of Ariane

Roles, voice types, premier cast
Role	Voice type	Premiere cast, 10 May 1907 (conductor: François Ruhlmann)
Ariane	soprano	Georgette Leblanc
La nourrice (Nurse)	contralto	Cécilie Thévenet
Barbe-bleue (Bluebeard)	bass	Félix Vieuille
Sélysette, one of Bluebeard's wives	contralto	Suzanne Brohly
Ygraine, one of Bluebeard's wives	soprano	Marthe Bakkers
Mélisande, one of Bluebeard's wives	soprano	Hélène Demellier
Bellangère, one of Bluebeard's wives	soprano	Berg
Alladine, one of Bluebeard's wives	mime	Régina Badet
An Old Peasant	bass	Louis Azéma
2nd Peasant	tenor	Lucazeau
3rd Peasant	bass	Tarquini
Chorus: Peasants, Crowd

== Instrumentation ==
The opera is scored for 3 flutes (3rd doubling piccolo), 2 oboes, English horn, 2 clarinets, bass clarinet, 3 bassoons, contrabassoon, 4 horns, 3 trumpets, 3 trombones, tuba, timpani, percussion (including glockenspiel, cymbals, triangle, side drum, bass drum), harp, and strings.

== Synopsis ==
=== Act 1 ===
Scene: A vast, lavish semi-circular hall in Barbe-bleue's castle

Ariane is destined to be Barbe-bleue's sixth wife. As she and her nurse arrive at Barbe-bleue's castle, they are greeted (offstage) by a chorus of peasants clamouring for Barbe-bleue's death because they believe he has murdered his former wives. Ariane is convinced they are still alive. She declares: Il m'aime, je suis belle, et j'aurai son secret. D'abord il faut désobéir: c'est le premier devoir quand l'ordre est menaçant et ne s'explique pas. – Les autres ont eu tort et les voilà perdues pour avoir hésité. ("He loves me, I am beautiful, and I will discover his secret. First one must disobey: it's the primal duty when an order is menacing and unexplained. – The others were mistaken and now they are lost because they hesitated.")

Barbe-bleue has given her seven keys to his treasure chambers: the six silver ones she is permitted to use, but the seventh, golden key is forbidden. Ariane says this is the only key which matters and goes to look for the seventh door while her nurse opens the others. The nurse turns the lock in the first door and a cascade of jewels and other treasures spills out. The second door reveals a "shower of sapphires"; the third, a "deluge of pearls"; the fourth, a "waterfall of emeralds"; the fifth, "a tragic torrent of rubies". Ariane is unimpressed by the gems, although the contents of the sixth, "avalanches of gigantic diamonds", elicit a cry of wonder from her ("O mes clairs diamants!"). The sixth door also reveals the vault containing the seventh to Ariane. Ignoring her nurse's warning, she turns the golden key in the lock. At first it reveals nothing but darkness, then "the stifled sounds of far away singing rise from the bowels of the earth and spread across the hall." It is the voices of Barbe-bleue's other wives singing a folk song "Les cinq filles d'Orlamonde" ("The five maids of Orlamonde"). The nurse is terrified and tries to shut the door again but she is powerless to move it as the voices draw nearer. At the last words of the song, Barbe-bleue enters the hall. He accuses Ariane: Vous aussi... ("You too..."). She replies, Moi surtout ("Me above all"). He tells her that through her disobedience she is abandoning the happiness he has offered her. She tells him, "The happiness I want cannot thrive in the shadows." Barbe-bleue grabs her by the arm and tries to drag her towards the seventh door. As he does so, the furious peasants smash the windows and break into the hall to confront Barbe-bleue, who draws his sword in defence. But Ariane calmly turns to the crowd and asks them "What do you want? – He has done me no harm" before closing the door on them.

=== Act 2 ===
Scene: A vast, underground hall, at first shrouded in almost complete darkness

The seventh door has shut behind Ariane and the nurse. They explore the darkness with the aid of a lamp. Ariane is not afraid and believes Barbe-bleue will free them of his own accord: Il est blessé, il est vaincu, mais il l'ignore encore... ("He is wounded, he is defeated, but he doesn't know it yet..."). She finds the other wives hiding in the darkness, dressed in rags and terrified, but alive. She embraces them and says she has come to free them. She asks them if they have tried to escape. One wife (Sélysette) replies: On ne pourrait pas fuir; car tout est bien fermé; et puis c'est défendu ("We couldn't; everything is barred and bolted; besides, it is forbidden.") She asks their names and they give them, except for Alladine who is a foreigner and unable to speak. Drops of water from the vault extinguish Ariane's lamp and they are plunged into darkness. But Ariane thinks she can make out a faint source of light and gropes towards it. She finds it is a stained-glass window covered in grime. Taking a stone, she smashes the panes one by one and is dazzled by the light flooding in. The wives follow her. They can hear the sound of the sea, wind in the trees and the singing of birds. They gaze on a green country landscape as a village clock strikes midday. Ariane tells them not to be afraid but to follow the stone steps which lead down into the outside world.

=== Act 3 ===
Scene: The same as Act 1

The castle's magic defences have prevented the wives from escaping and they find themselves in the hall, but they are happy as long as they are with Ariane. Barbe-bleue is nowhere to be seen. Ariane is certain they will soon be liberated. She helps the other wives to decorate themselves with the jewels from the six doors. The nurse enters and tells them Barbe-bleue is on his way. They look through the windows only to see Barbe-bleue's carriage ambushed by rebel peasants. Barbe-bleue's bodyguard is cut down and he is badly beaten. Ariane pleads with them not to kill him but they cannot hear. The peasants break down the castle door and enter with Barbe-bleue roped up. They fall silent at the sight of his wives and willingly turn over their captive to Ariane so she can take "vengeance". She thanks them and persuades them to leave the castle. The wives delicately care for the wounded Barbe-bleue before Ariane cuts his bonds with a dagger. Barbe-bleue is free and silently gazes at Ariane. She bids him "Farewell". He makes a feeble attempt to stop her then relents. Ariane asks the other wives if they are going to follow her: La forêt et la mer nous appellent de loin et l'aurore se penche aux voûtes de l'azur, pour nous montrer un monde inondé d'espérance... ("The forest and the sea are beckoning from afar and dawn is spreading over the azure heavens and will reveal a world filled with hope..."). None of them accepts the offer and Ariane leaves alone with her nurse. The wives gaze at each other, then at Barbe-bleue, who slowly lifts up his head.

== Recordings ==
Five commercial recordings exist, as well as recordings of an orchestral suite, prepared by Arturo Toscanini and premiered in a 1947 broadcast by the NBC Symphony Orchestra.

=== Complete opera ===
- Ariane et Barbe-bleue, Berthe Montmart (Ariane), Xavier Depraz (Barbe-bleue), Marie Luce Bellary (the nurse), Janine Capderou (Sélysette), Denise Boursin (Ygraine), Nadine Sautereau (Mélisande), Claudine Collart (Bellangère); Chorus and Orchestra, conducted by Tony Aubin (Paris, 1968 / Gala, 2003)
- Ariane et Barbe-bleue, Katherine Ciesinski (Ariane), Gabriel Bacquier (Barbe-bleue), Mariana Paunova (the nurse), Hanna Schaer (Sélysette), Anne-Marie Blanzat (Ygraine), Jocelyne Chamonin (Mélisande), Michèle Command (Bellangère); Chœur et Nouvel Orchestre Philharmonique de Radio France, conducted by Armin Jordan (Paris, 1983 / Érato, 1983)
- Ariane et Barbe-bleue, Marilyn Schmiege (Ariane), Roderick Kennedy (Barbe-bleue), Jocelyne Taillon (the nurse), Cynthia Buchan (Sélysette), Monique Baudoin (Ygraine), Mitsuko Shirai (Mélisande), Francine Laurent (Bellangère); Kölner Rundfunkchor, Kölner Rundfunk-Sinfonie-Orchester, conducted by Gary Bertini (Cologne, 1986 / Capriccio, 2011)
- Ariane et Barbe-bleue, Deborah Polaski (Ariane), Kwangchul Youn (Barbe-bleue), Jane Henschel (the nurse), Ruxandra Donose (Sélysette), Stella Grigorian (Bellangère); Slovak Philharmonic Choir, Radio Symphonieorchester Wien, conducted by Bertrand de Billy (Vienna, 2006 / Oehms Classics, 2006)
- Ariane et Barbe-bleue, Lori Phillips (Ariane), Peter Rose (Barbe-bleue), Patricia Bardon (the nurse), Ana James (Ygraine), Daphné Touchais (Mélisande), Sarah-Jane Davies (Bellangère), Laura Vlasak Nolen (Sélysette); BBC Symphony Orchestra, BBC Singers, conducted by Leon Botstein (Watford, 2007 / Telarc, 2007)
- Ariane et Barbe-bleue, Jeanne-Michèle Charbonnet (Ariane), José van Dam (Barbe-bleue), Patricia Bardon (the nurse), Beatriz Jiménes (Ygraine), Elena Copons (Mélisande), Salomé Maller (Bellangère), Gemma Coma-Alabert (Sélysette), Alba Valldaura (Alladine); Orchestra and Chorus of the Gran Teatre del Liceu, conducted by Stéphane Denève (Opus Arte, 2013)

=== Suite ===
- Ariane et Barbe-bleue, suite, NBC Symphony Orchestra and Chorus, conducted by Arturo Toscanini, 1947 NBC broadcast concert (Urania)
