= John Rose =

John Rose may refer to:

== People ==
=== Politicians ===
- John Rose (fl. 1399), MP for Totnes
- John Rose (died 1591), English MP for Canterbury
- John B. Rose (1875–1949), New York politician
- John A. Rose (born 1940), Kentucky politician
- John M. Rose (1856–1923), US Congressman from Pennsylvania
- Murray Rose (politician) (John Murray Rose, 1939–2021), New Zealand politician
- Sir John Rose, 1st Baronet (1820–1888), Canadian politician
- John Rose (Minnesota politician) (1934–1988), American state representative and former teacher
- John Rose (Tennessee politician) (born 1965), U.S. Representative for Tennessee's 6th congressional district, Former Commissioner of Agriculture for the State of Tennessee
- John Rose (socialist) (1945–2024), British anti-Zionist activist

=== Others ===
- John Rose (potter), 18th-century founder of Coalport porcelain
- John Rose, founder of Rose Creative Strategies, a subsidiary of Rose Marketing Ltd.
- Sir John Rose (businessman) (born 1952), British businessman
- John Rose (chemist) (1911–1976), British research chemist with ICI
- John Rose (Oxford) (1925–2004), British founder of Daily Information
- John Rose (cricketer) (1853–1920), English cricketer
- John Carter Rose (1861–1927), American federal judge
  - SS John Carter Rose, a Liberty ship
- John Holland Rose (1855–1942), British historian
- John R. Rose, American cartoonist
- John Rose (luthiers), father-and-son luthiers in London during the latter half of the 16th and early 17th centuries
- John Rose, name assumed while serving in the American Revolutionary War by Gustave Rosenthal (1753–1829), Baltic-German nobleman
- Oren John Rose (1892–1971), American World War I flying ace who served in British and American military forces

== Places ==
- John Rose Minnesota Oval, ice skating rink in Roseville, Minnesota

== See also ==
- Jack Rose (disambiguation)
- Jon Rose (born 1951), Australian violinist
