= Rosier (surname) =

Rosier is a surname. Notable people with the surname include:

- A. J. Rosier (1880–1932), American politician
- Andrée Rosier (born 1978), French chef
- Bertie Rosier (1893–1939), English footballer
- Bruce Rosier (1928–2019), Australian Anglican bishop
- Cathy Rosier (1945–2004), Martiniquaise model and actress
- Diego Rosier (born 1994), South African cricketer
- Evan Rosier, fictional character in the Harry Potter universe
- Frederick Rosier (1915–1998), Welsh Royal Air Force commander
- Jacqueline Beaugé-Rosier (1932–2016), Haitian–Canadian educator and writer
- James Rosier (1573–1609), English explorer
- Jean-Louis Rosier (1925–2011), French racing driver
- Joan Rosier-Jones (born 1940), New Zealand writer and teacher
- Joseph Rosier (1870–1951), American politician
- Joseph-Bernard Rosier (1804–1880), French playwright and librettist
- Kevin Rosier (1962–2015), American kickboxer, boxer and mixed martial artist
- Louis Rosier (1905–1956), French racing driver
- Lucas Rosier (born 2007), French footballer
- Malik Rosier (born 1995), American football player
- Michel Rosier (1951-2004), a French historian of economics
- Michèle Rosier (1930–2017), French fashion journalist and designer
- Pat Rosier (1942–2014), New Zealand writer, editor and feminist activist
- Raymond Rosier (1924–1961), Belgian Olympic runner
- Trevor Rosier (1943–2023), English cricketer
- Valentin Rosier (born 1996), French footballer

== Fictional Characters with the Surname Rosier ==
- Evan Rosier, Character in Harry Potter
- Pandora Rosier (Pandora Lovegood), Character in Harry Potter (headcanon)

== See also ==
- Roger Rosiers (born 1946), Belgian racing cyclist
- Desrosiers, a surname (including a list of people with the name)
- Roser (name), a surname and a given name (including lists of people with the name)
- Rosier (disambiguation)
