= Lee Rose =

Lee Rose may refer to:

- Lee Rose (basketball) (1936–2022), American basketball coach
- Lee Rose (director), American film and television director
- Lee Rose (lighting designer) (born 1955), American lighting designer
- Lee Rose (rugby league) (1924–1976), Australian rugby league player

== See also ==
- Rose (surname)
