= Stephanie Rose =

Stephanie Rose may refer to:

- Stephanie M. Rose (born 1972), American jurist, United States District Court judge for the Southern District of Iowa
- Stephanie Rose (model), Australian model of Filipino descent
- Stephanie Rose (painter) (1943–2023), American painter
