= List of knights bachelor appointed in 1914 =

Knight Bachelor is the oldest and lowest-ranking form of knighthood in the British honours system; it is the rank granted to a man who has been knighted by the monarch but not inducted as a member of one of the organised orders of chivalry. Women are not knighted; in practice, the equivalent award for a woman is appointment as Dame Commander of the Order of the British Empire (founded in 1917).

== Knights bachelor appointed in 1914 ==
| Date | Name | Notes | Ref |
|---|---|---|---|
| 1 January 1914 | His Honour Judge Lumley Smith | | |
| 1 January 1914 | Timothy Augustine Coghlan, ISO | Agent-General in London for the State of New South Wales | |
| 1 January 1914 | Reginald Brodie Dyke Acland, KC | | |
| 1 January 1914 | Ponnambalam Arunachalam, MA | late Registrar-General of the Island of Ceylon | |
| 1 January 1914 | Robert Blair | Education Officer of the London County Council | |
| 1 January 1914 | Alexander Kaye Butterworth | General Manager of the North-Eastern Railway | |
| 1 January 1914 | William Henry Clarke | Deputy Lieutenant for Cambridgeshire | |
| 1 January 1914 | John Clough | | |
| 1 January 1914 | Howard Frank | | |
| 1 January 1914 | William Edward Garforth | | |
| 1 January 1914 | William Garth | Barrister-at-Law, Calcutta | |
| 1 January 1914 | Lt-Col. Arthur Leetham | Secretary of the Royal United Service Institution | |
| 1 January 1914 | Thomas Munro | County Clerk of Lanarkshire | |
| 1 January 1914 | Robert Murray | | |
| 1 January 1914 | Frederick John Norman | | |
| 1 January 1914 | John Parks | Deputy Mayor of Bury, Lancashire | |
| 1 January 1914 | William Henry Robinson | | |
| 1 January 1914 | Ernest Rutherford, FRS | Langworthy Professor and Director of Physical Laboratory, University of Manchester | |
| 1 January 1914 | Owen Seaman | | |
| 1 January 1914 | William James Thomas | | |
| 1 January 1914 | Samuel Turner | | |
| 1 January 1914 | Richard Winfrey, MP | | |
| 1 January 1914 | The Hon. Horace Archambault | Chief Justice of the Province of Quebec in the Dominion of Canada | |
| 1 January 1914 | Thomas de Multon Lee Braddell | Chief Judicial Commissioner, Federated Malay States | |
| 1 January 1914 | Harry Brookes Allen, MD, BS, LLD | Professor of Pathology and Dean of the Faculty of Medicine, University of Melbourne | |
| 1 January 1914 | Maitland Hall Park, MA, LLD | | |
| 1 January 1914 | Henry Kelly Egan | | |
| 1 January 1914 | Surgeon-General Arthur Thomas Sloggett, CB, CMG, RAMC | Honorary Surgeon to the- King, Director of Medical Services in India | |
| 1 January 1914 | Duncan James Macpherson, CIE | Indian Civil Service; Additional Member of the Council of the Governor-General of India | |
| 1 January 1914 | William Arthur Johns, CIE | Indian Public Works Department | |
| 1 January 1914 | Alfred Kensington | Indian Civil Service; Judge of the Chief Court of the Punjab | |
| 1 January 1914 | Henry Sulivan Hartnoll | Indian Civil Service; Judge of the Chief Court of Lower Burma | |
| 1 January 1914 | John Alexander Boyson | | |
| 1 January 1914 | Temulji Bhikaji Nariman | Justice of the Peace for the town of Bombay | |
| 1 January 1914 | Ernest Henry Lamb, CMG | | |
| 1 January 1914 | Charles Alfred Payton, MVO | | |
| 1 January 1914 | Courtenay Walter Bennett, CIE | Bennett's knighthood was announced in the 1914 New Year Honours (he was then Consul-General in New York); he was unable to attend the investiture in February. His investiture thereafter does appear to have been gazetted. | |
| 2 May 1914 | Montague Shearman | Justice of the High Court of Justice | |
| 2 May 1914 | John Sankey | Justice of the High Court of Justice | |
| 11 June 1914 | Francis William Thomas Brain | | |
| 11 June 1914 | Col. Wallis King, MVO | | |
| 11 June 1914 | Lt-Col. John Barnsley | | |
| 11 June 1914 | Thomas Robert Bethell | | |
| 11 June 1914 | James Bradford | | |
| 11 June 1914 | John James Burnet, LLD, FRSE | | |
| 11 June 1914 | Ellis Denby | | |
| 11 June 1914 | James Hastings Duncan, MP | | |
| 11 June 1914 | James George Frazer, LLD, DCL | | |
| 11 June 1914 | Joseph Edward Godfrey, MB | late Surgeon-General and Chairman of the Local Government Board, British Guiana | |
| 11 June 1914 | Edwin Hamer | | |
| 11 June 1914 | George Henschel, MusDoc | | |
| 11 June 1914 | Wilmot Parker Herringham, MD, FRCP | | |
| 11 June 1914 | Lt-Col. John Humphery | Sheriff of the City of London | |
| 11 June 1914 | William Henry St John Hope, LittD | | |
| 11 June 1914 | James Edward Jones | | |
| 11 June 1914 | James Leishman | Chairman of the National Health Insurance Commission, Scotland | |
| 11 June 1914 | Robert Cook Lockhart | Provost of Kirkcaldy | |
| 11 June 1914 | Douglas Mawson, DSc | | |
| 11 June 1914 | William Milligan, MD | | |
| 11 June 1914 | John Gordon Nairne | | |
| 11 June 1914 | John Robert O'Connell, LLD | | |
| 11 June 1914 | Frederic George Painter | Sheriff of the City of London | |
| 11 June 1914 | Thomas Kirke Rose, DSc | | |
| 11 June 1914 | Charles Scarth | | |
| 11 June 1914 | Seymour John Sharkey, MD, FRCP | | |
| 11 June 1914 | Lindsey Smith | Judge at Zanzibar | |
| 11 June 1914 | John Francis Claverton Snell | | |
| 11 June 1914 | Albert Henry Stanley | | |
| 11 June 1914 | James Urquhart | | |
| 11 June 1914 | William Shaw Wright | | |
| 11 June 1914 | Leslie Creery Miller | Indian Civil Service; a Puisne Judge of the High Court of Judicature, Fort St George, Madras | |
| 11 June 1914 | Frederick Lawrence Sprott | Public Works Department; Chairman, Bombay Trust, and an additional member of the Council of the Governor of Bombay for making Laws and Regulations | |
| 11 June 1914 | Stanley Lockhart Batchelor | Indian Civil Service; a Puisne Judge of the High Court of Judicature, Bombay | |
| 11 June 1914 | Lt-Col. Leonard Rogers, CIE, FRCP, FRCS | Indian Medical Service; Professor of Pathology, Medical College, Calcutta, and Bacteriologist to Government. | |
| 11 June 1914 | James Albert Manning Aikins, KC | Member of the House of Commons of the Dominion of Canada | |
| 11 June 1914 | The Hon. Adam Beck | Member of the Executive Council of the Province of Ontario, in the Dominion of Canada | |
| 11 June 1914 | Joseph Brown | President of the Legislative Council of the Bahama Islands | |
| 11 June 1914 | Evelyn Campbell Ellis | Unofficial Member of the Legislative Council of the Straits Settlements | |
| 11 June 1914 | Furcy Alfred Herchenroder | Chief Judge of the Supreme Court of theColony of Mauritius | |
| 11 June 1914 | Thomas George Roddick, MD, LLD | | |
| 11 June 1914 | Thomas Peter Anderson Stuart, MD, ChM, LLD, DSc | Professor of Physiology and Dean of the Faculty of Medicine, University of Sydney | |
| 11 June 1914 | The Hon. William Wilfred Sullivan | Chief Justice of the Supreme Court of Judicature for the Province of Prince Edward Island, in the Dominion of Canada | |
| 11 June 1914 | Alfred Edward Thomson, MD | | |
| 11 June 1914 | Hector William Van Cuylenburg | Unofficial Member of the Legislative Council of the Island of Ceylon | |
