= Judd Rose =

American television journalist

Judd Rose (1955 - June 10, 2000) was a television journalist.

While a college student at UCLA, Rose was a reporter for the student newspaper, during which time he also appeared as a contestant on the final episode of the ABC game show Split Second in 1975.

He rose to prominence as an investigative reporter for ABC News, where Rose spent 16 years working on shows such as Prime Time Live and Good Morning America. His first Emmy came in 1987 for covering the fall of Philippine president Ferdinand Marcos, and he would go on to receive a total of four Emmy awards. He ended his career as co-anchor of the CNN program Newsstand. Rose died in June 2000, while undergoing treatment for a brain tumor.

His father was radio talk show host Hilly Rose. His mother was Sondra Gair, a 1940s radio actress turned award-winning public radio broadcaster and host of Midday with Sondra Gair. His brother is Roger Rose, an actor, voice actor, and former VH1 VJ.

== See also ==
- List of notable brain tumor patients
