= Peter Rose =

Peter or Pete Rose may refer to:

== Sportspeople ==
- Pete Rose (1941–2024), American baseball player and manager
- Pete Rose Jr. (born 1969), American baseball player

== Other people ==
- Peter Rose (author) (born 1939), American author and food historian
- Pete Rose (musician) (1942–2018), American musician
- Peter Rose (opera singer), English opera singer
- Peter Rose (architect) (born 1943), designer of the Canadian Centre for Architecture
- Peter Rose (poet) (born 1955), Australian poet
- Peter Rose, British music writer

== Other ==
- Pete Rose Baseball, a video game for the Atari 2600

== See also ==
- Peter DeRose (1900–1953), composer of jazz and pop music during the Tin Pan Alley era
- Peter Roes (born 1964), Belgian racing cyclist
