= Danielle M. Dick =

American psychologist

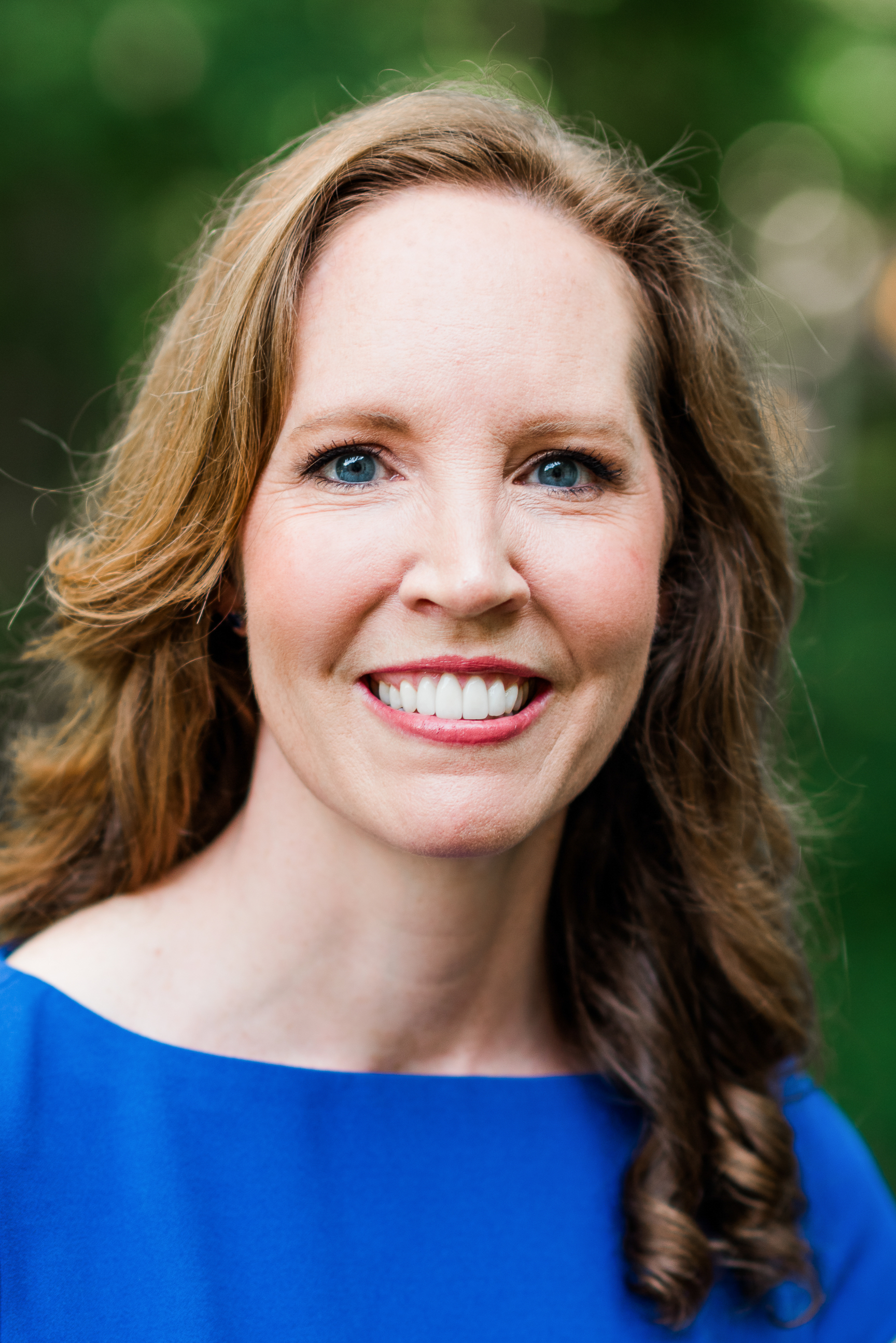

Academic background
- Education: BSc, 1997, University of Virginia; PhD, 2001, Indiana University Bloomington
- Thesis: Genes, environments, and interactions: Specifying influences on alcohol use and related phenotypes (2001)
- Doctoral advisor: Richard J. Rose

Academic work
- Institutions: Rutgers University; Virginia Commonwealth University; Washington University in St. Louis
- Main interests: Behavior genetics
- Website: danielledick.com

Danielle Marie Dick is an American psychologist. She is the inaugural director of the Rutgers Addiction Research Center at the Rutgers Brain Health Institute. She researches the genetic epidemiology of substance abuse and related behavioral disorders.

== Early life ==
Dick completed her PhD at Indiana University Bloomington and she remained at the institution for her postdoctoral fellowship in the Department of Medical and Molecular Genetics.

== Career ==
Following her postdoctoral fellowship, Dick joined the faculty at Washington University School of Medicine. As a research assistant professor of psychiatry, Dick continued her research into behavior genetics and its relation to genetics. In 2004, she was part of a research team which were the first to link γ-Aminobutyric acid genes to an increased risk of alcoholism. Later, Dick and her research team confirmed a link between the gene CHRM2 and performance IQ. They found that several variations within the CHRM2 gene could be correlated with slight differences in performance IQ scores and could affect someone's visual-motor coordination logical, sequential reasoning spatial perception, and abstract problem-solving skills. Dick eventually left Washington University to join the faculty at Virginia Commonwealth University. As a faculty member, she was the principal investigator on a longitudinal study of genetic and environmental influences on substance use and emotional health among university students.

In September 2021, Dick published a book, The Child Code: Understanding Your Child's Unique Nature for Happier, More Effective Parenting, which provides a "science-based approach to parenting centered on a child’s unique genetic 'code'".

In January 2022, Dick was named the inaugural director of the Rutgers Addiction Research Center and was appointed as tenured professor in the Department of Psychiatry at the Robert Wood Johnson Medical School. Later in October, Dick was named the inaugural holder of the Gregory Q. Brown Chair in Cell Biology and Neuroscience.

== Research ==
Dick is involved in gene identification projects, with focus on how phenotypic characterization can enhance gene identification; on mapping the risk associated with identified genetic variants across development and in conjunction with the environment; and on using basic science findings to develop more tailored, personalized prevention and intervention.

== Personal life ==
Dick is married and has two children; a son and stepdaughter.
