= Ellis Road =

Street in Singapore

Ellis Road is a road close to the city centre of Singapore. It is accessible only by Tanglin Road, and provides access to The Regent Hotel.

== History ==
Ellis Road used to be the access road to a cluster of Malay kampong (hamlet or village) houses. The road was named after Sir Evelyn Campbell Ellis. It was referred to by the local Malays as Kampong Tanglin Ellis Road. The village had their own mosque that was demolished in the 1970s to make way for modern commercial buildings.
