= Hector van Cuylenburg =

Ceylonese lawyer, newspaper proprietor and politician (1847–1915)

Lieutenant Colonel Sir Hector van Cuylenburg
- Born: Hector William van Cuylenburg; 23 January 1847; Kalutara, Ceylon
- Died: 11 December 1915 (aged 68)
- Education: S. Thomas' College; Queen's College
- Occupations: lawyer, newspaper proprietor, politician
- Spouse: Joselina Sissouw née Morgan
- Children: Hector Richard Henry

Lieutenant Colonel Sir Hector William van Cuylenburg, VD (23 January 1847 – 11 December 1915) was a Ceylonese lawyer, newspaper proprietor and legislator. He was elected as the first unofficial member representing the Burghers in the Legislative Council of Ceylon.

== Early life and education ==
Hector William van Cuylenburg was born on 23 January 1847, the son of Dr Petrus Henricus van Cuylenburg, the Assistant Colonial Surgeon in the Colonial Medical Department of Ceylon and Eliza Morgan, the fourth of nine children. He was educated at S. Thomas' College and Royal College, Colombo.

== Legal career ==
After completing his schooling, he served an apprenticeship with Charles Ambrose Lorensz and in 1868 was called to the bar as a proctor. He started his practice in Kalutara and later moved to Colombo. In 1876 he was engaged as a Crown Proctor by the Queen's Advocate, following which he became a member of Gray's Inn becoming a barrister and on his return to Ceylon became an advocate. In 1886 he competed in the Wimbledon Cup and in 1894 in the Queen's Prize.

== Military service ==
In 1881 he was among the first individuals to join the Ceylon Volunteer Force, and continued to serve on their active list until 1911, when he retired with the brevet rank of Lieutenant Colonel having served as the second-in-command of the Ceylon Light Infantry Volunteers under the command of Lieutenant Colonel Richard Hillebrand Morgan and was awarded the Volunteer Officers' Decoration.

== Ceylon Independent ==
In 1888 van Cuylenberg together with William Maitland, established the first daily morning paper, the Ceylon Independent, the first edition of which was published on 4 July. The paper's initial editor was Mr Heath, the former Reuters Agent in Colombo, however he died a few months after the paper was established. In 1889 a new editor for the paper, George Wall, was appointed, who agitated for a more responsible form of government for the country. Van Cuylenberg remained editor-in-chief until 1898 when he relinquished the position to J. Scott Coates.

== Legislative Council ==
In 1911 van Cuylenburg became the first elected Burgher representative in the Legislative Council of Ceylon,. He was elected with 829 votes, with H Geo Thomas and Arthur Alvis receiving 466 votes and 273 votes respectively. A total of 1,568 Burghers (72.9%) of the total 2,149 registered voters casting their vote. Sir Hector van Cuylenburg held the position until his death in December 1915.

== Honors ==
In 1913 he was elected as the fourth president of the Dutch Burgher Union of Ceylon. In 1914 van Cuylenburg was appointed a Knight Bachelor.

== Family ==
On 10 July 1872 he married his cousin, Joselina Sissouw née Morgan, daughter of Sir Richard Morgan, the 13th Queen's Advocate of Ceylon and acting Chief Justice of Ceylon; and they had one child, Captain Hector Richard Henry Morgan van Cuylenburg, Barrister from Gray's Inn (b. 3 November 1875).
