= Roser (name) =

Roser or Röser is a name of German origin. It may be related to the French Rosier.

== People with the given name ==
- Roser (singer) (born 1979), Spanish singer
- Roser Aguilar (born 1971), Spanish film director and screenwriter
- Roser Amadó (1944–2023), Spanish architect
- Roser Bastida Areny (born 1955), Andorran politician
- Roser Bru (1923–2021), Spanish-Chilean painter and engraver
- Roser Caminals-Heath, Spanish author and professor
- Roser Serra (born 1971), Spanish footballer
- Roser Tarragó (born 1993), Spanish water polo player
- Roser Vives (born 1984), Spanish swimmer

== People with the surname ==
- Albrecht Roser (1922–2011), German puppeteer
- Bunny Roser (1901–1979), American baseball player
- Ce Roser (born 1930), American artist
- Charles Roser (1864–1937, American businessman and philanthropist
- Isabella Roser (fl. 1520–1547), Spanish noblewoman
- Lucas Röser (born 1993), German footballer
- Mario Röser (born 1966), German footballer
- Martin Röser (born 1990), German footballer
- Max Roser (born 1983), German-British economist and media critic
- Natalie Roser (born 1990), Australian model
- Steve Roser (1918–2002), American baseball player
- Uroš Rošer (born 1986), Slovenian footballer
- Wilhelm Roser (1817–1888), German surgeon and ophthalmologist

== See also ==
- Rose (given name)
- Rose (surname)
