= Rosier =

Rosier may refer to:

- Rosier (demon), a name included in Gustav Davidson’s 1967 A Dictionary Of Angels
- "Rosier" (song), a 1994 single by Luna Sea
- Rosier (surname), including a list of people with the name

== See also ==
- Le Rosier de Madame Husson, an 1887 novella by Guy de Maupassant
- Le Rosier miraculeux, a 1904 French short silent film
- Saint-Hilaire-du-Rosier, a commune in the Isère department, France
