= Richard Rose =

Richard Rose may refer to:

- Richard Rose (mystic) (1917–2005), American mystic, esoteric philosopher, author, poet, and investigator of paranormal phenomena
- Richard Rose (political scientist) (born 1933), American political scientist and professor
- Richard Rose (footballer) (born 1982), English footballer
- Richard Rose (director) (born 1955), Canadian theatre director
- M. Richard Rose (1933–2021), president of Alfred University and of the Rochester Institute of Technology
- Richard Rose (MP) (died c. 1658), English merchant and politician
- Richard J. Rose (born 1935), American psychologist
- Richard Rose, a doctor who was involved in the Gary Ramona case
