= Rosé (surname) =

Rosé is a surname. Notable people with the name include:

- Alfred Rosé (1902–1975), Austrian composer and conductor
- Alma Rosé (1906–1944), Austrian violinist of Jewish descent
- Arnold Rosé (1863–1946), Romanian-born Austrian Jewish violinist
- Carolyn Rosé, American computer scientist
- Eduard Rosé (1859–1943), German cellist and concert master
- Karlos Rosé (born 1995), Dominican singer

== See also ==
- Rose (surname)
