= Christopher Rose =

Christopher or Chris Rose may refer to:

- Sir Christopher Rose (judge) (born 1937), English Lord Justice of Appeal
- Christopher Rose (electrical engineer) (born 1957), American electrical engineer and professor
- Chris Rose (artist) (born 1959), British wildlife artist
- Chris Rose (journalist) (born 1960), American journalist and writer
- Chris Rose (born 1971), American television sportscaster
- Chris Rose (politician) (born 1990/91), American politician

== See also ==
- Christine Rose (disambiguation)
