= Evelyn Campbell Ellis =

British lawyer and colonial administrator (1865–1920)

Sir Evelyn Campbell Ellis
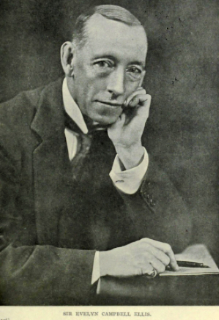
- Born: 8 December 1865; London
- Died: 1 September 1920 (aged 54)
- Occupations: Lawyer and colonial administrator

Sir Evelyn Campbell Ellis (8 December 1865 – 1 September 1920) was a British lawyer and colonial administrator. He was acting Attorney-General of the Straits Settlements in 1912 and 1913.

== Early life ==
Ellis was born on 8 December 1865 in London, the son of Dr Robert Ellis, MRCS. He was educated in a private school in Devon. After serving his articles with a solicitor's firm, in 1889, he was admitted as a solicitor in England.

== Career ==
After qualifying as a solicitor, Ellis went to Hong Kong in 1891 where he practised for five years. In 1896, he joined the firm of Drew and Napier in Singapore, was admitted as a solicitor and advocate of the Straits Settlements, and became a partner. Later he became the head of the firm. When Hugh Fort left Singapore, he became leader of the local Bar. He was known as a formidable advocate who rarely lost a case: "Neither in Court nor in Council would he brook opposition, and from the definite way he had of stating his propositions he became early to be known as Cocky."

Ellis was acting Attorney-General, Straits Settlements in 1912 and 1913. He was a member of the Statute Law Revision Commission of the Straits Settlements from 1912 to 1916. He was a member of the Court of Inquiry which investigated the 1915 Singapore Mutiny. He served as an unofficial member of the Legislative Council of the Straits Settlements from 1908 to 1916, and was described as a someone who "showed himself a fearsome opponent of any measure which he could not conscientiously approve of, and when he thought something should go through, he defended it heart and soul". He retired in 1916.

== Personal life and death ==
Ellis was a keen volunteer. He joined the Maxim detachment of the Volunteer Artillery in Hong Kong in 1894, and in 1899 was gazetted as Second Lieutenant. After arriving in Singapore he joined the Volunteer Singapore Rifles as Lieutenant and in 1907 received the rank of Major commanding the infantry units in Singapore.

He was a keen sportsman who was a prominent member of the local clubs, and during his twenty years connection with Singapore from 1896 to 1916 took a leading role in many of its social activities.

Ellis married Margaret Craig in 1900. After she died in 1918, Ellis married Kathleen Rose Jenkins, widow (née Abernethy), head sister of St Bartholomew's Hospital for 14 years.

Ellis died on 1 September 1920, aged 54.

== Honours ==
Ellis was created a Knight Bachelor in the 1914 Birthday Honours.

Ellis Road in Singapore was named after him.
