= Thomas Rose =

Thomas Rose may refer to:

- Harry Rose (footballer) (Thomas Harry Rose, 1870-1946), English footballer
- Thomas E. Rose, American general during the American Civil War
- Thomas G. Rose (1901–1979), English cricketer
- Thomas Kirke Rose, British chemist and metallurgist
- Thomas M. Rose (born 1948), U.S. federal judge
- Thomas Rose (RAF officer) (1895–1968), British flying ace
- Thomas Rose (died 1837), publican and pioneer settler in colonial Sydney
- Thomas Rose (politician) (1856–1926), Australian politician
- Thomas Rose (died 1747) of Wootton Fitzpaine, Sheriff of Dorset in 1715
