= David Rose =

David Rose may refer to:

== Business ==
- David Rose (real estate developer) (1892–1986), American real estate developer and philanthropist
- David L. Rose (born 1967), American business executive and scientist at MIT Media Lab
- David S. Rose (born 1957), American technology entrepreneur and angel investor

== Entertainment ==
- David Rose (artist) (1910–2006), American artist
- David Rose (songwriter) (1910–1990), British-American songwriter, composer, arranger and orchestra leader
- David Rose (producer) (1924–2017), British television producer and editor

== Politics ==
- David Rose (American politician), Arizona state legislator
- David Rose (Guyanese politician) (1923–1969), Governor-General of Guyana
- David Rose (UK politician), Northern Irish unionist politician
- David Stuart Rose (1856–1932), mayor of Milwaukee, Wisconsin, US

== Sports ==
- Dave Rose (basketball) (born 1957), head basketball coach at Brigham Young University
- David Rose (rugby) (1931–2021), Scottish rugby union and Great Britain rugby league footballer
- David Rose (club secretary) (1940s–2024), football club secretary of Ipswich Town F.C.

== Others ==
- David A. Rose (1906–1995), American lawyer and judge who served in the Massachusetts state courts
- David Rose (journalist) (born 1959), British writer and journalist
- David J. Rose (1922–1985), professor of nuclear engineering
- David Rose (bishop) (1913–1997), American prelate
- David Rose (Schitt's Creek), character on the CBC and Pop TV sitcom Schitt's Creek
- Dave Rose, one of the builders of Robot Wars competitor Hypno-Disc
