= Hilary Rose =

Hilary Rose may refer to:

- Hilary Rose (actress) (born 1979), Irish actress and writer
- Hilary Rose (field hockey) (born 1971), British field hockey goalkeeper
- Hilary Rose (sociologist) (born 1935), British feminist; professor of sociology and social policy; author on science policy.
