= William Balthazar Rose =

English painter

- Born: 1961 (age 64–65); Cambridge, England
- Known for: Paintings of Cooks, Still Life, Landscapes, Night Scenes
- Notable work: The Red Shoe, Before the Law
- Style: Figurative
- Movement: Neo-figurative art, Remodernism, Bay Area Figurative Movement
- Spouse: Wende Elliott
- Awards: Eisner Prize; 1982
- Website: www.william-balthazar-rose.co.uk

William Balthazar Rose (born 1961) is an English painter living near Umbertide Italy and the city of Bath, England. He is the first son of artist parents Jasper Allison Rose and Jean Melville Rose. He works in a number of genres of which he is best known for his ‘Cooks’.

== Life and career ==
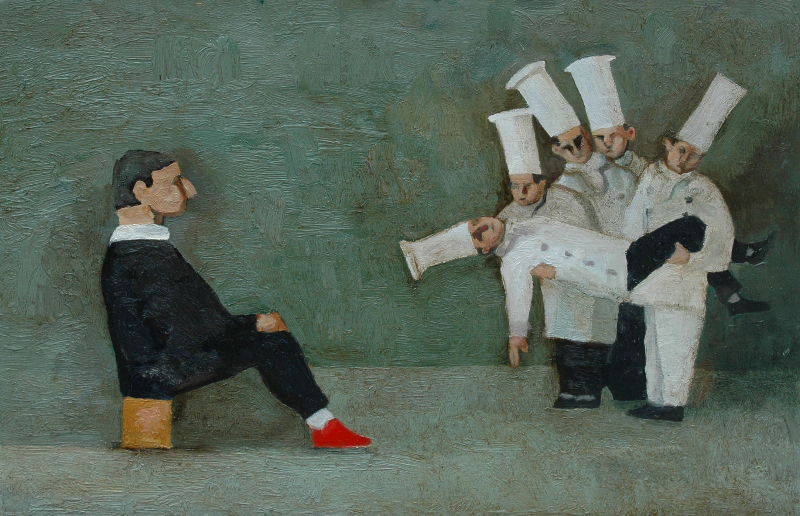
'The Red Shoe' by William Balthazar Rose

William Rose Balthazar was born in Cambridge, England in 1961. His family moved to Texas and then Mexico before his father became a founding member of the University of California, Santa Cruz. As a child he began to draw and paint and he received degrees from the College of Environmental Design, University of California, Berkeley (BA), and later a Master of Architecture from Princeton University. He studied with Jack Zajac and Eduardo Carillo when taking courses at U.C.S.C. and Kes Zapkus at Princeton University. Subsequently, he worked in the architectural offices of Michael Graves, Ralph Lerner (the Indira Gandhi National Centre for the Arts) and Mark Mack, before devoting himself to painting. He has lectured at Princeton University, the University of California, Berkeley, and at Baskin Arts on the University of California, Santa Cruz campus.

Since 1990 he devoted himself to painting, initially basing himself in San Francisco. His work was featured at the Campbell Thiebaud Gallery (later the Paul Thiebaud Gallery), San Francisco. He became acquainted with Dennis Hare, Christopher Brown, Anthony Dubovsky and other exponents of the Bay Area Figurative Movement. Wayne Thiebaud was one of the first painters to recognise his talents purchasing his work through his son Paul's Gallery.

Following in the footsteps of Balthus, he moved to Sansepolcro, Tuscany, the birthplace of Piero della Francesca in 2003. Rose has lived for several years in Bath while maintaining residences in Monte Santa Maria Tiberina, Umbria and Borgo Sansepolcro, Tuscany. Rose has exhibited widely in the United States, England and continental Europe (see below). His work has been deeply influenced by Cézanne, Chardin, Corot, Giorgio Morandi and Goya in painting, and Pasolini and Peter Greenaway in film.

Balthazar began painting the series that he calls ‘Cooks’ in 1991. The first examples were painted on small wooden panels and usually included a larger figure sitting to one side. Often inspired by medieval painting there is a comic quality to these painting which despite their origins in religious iconography speak of humanity’s eternal role as actors on the stage of life, sometimes play acting with great humour and other times acting out the gravest of tragedies. He has had solo shows alongside Howard Hodgkin and Wolf Kahn as well as group exhibitions with Alberto Sughi, Adriano Alumni, Mario Tozzi and Ottone Rosai.

His talents and inspiration have been widely recognised by critics and patrons alike, best summarised by the following extract from Peter Davies' essay on Rose in a recent catalogue for Brian Sinfield gallery:

Indeed, despite a declared preference for the older European tradition, Rose made early professional inroads on the West Coast which saw him meeting the leading American painter Wayne Thiebaud whose hyperreal serialized depictions of cakes and food items suggested the culinary thread later used in Rose's chef compositions. Thiebaud, described by the younger British artist as a "straightforward man" typified the hard-headed pragmatism and rationalism of the modern American artist, a world apart from the eccentric and introspective romanticism of the English ‘school’, and there is no doubt that Thiebauld inspired Rose's acquisition of a detached professional persona... At times Rose conjures late Sickert, Beckmann, Balthus, Morandi, Manet, and Cezanne, variously inimitable and idiosyncratic painters who provide an oblique benchmark for Rose's inherent individualism and privileged position on a post-modern pluralist parapet.

== Honors and awards ==
- Eisner prize, College of Environmental Design, University of California, Berkeley (1982)
- Princeton full fellowship (1987–1989)
- Bath Society of Artists (2010)
- First ever Artist-in-Residence, The Bishop's Palace, Wells (2013)

== Selected exhibitions ==
=== United Kingdom ===
- Bishop's Palace, Wells, Somerset
- Gallery 27, London
- Peteleys, London
- Mariners’ Gallery, St. Ives
- The London Contemporary Art Fair, London
- The Royal College of Art, London
- Business Design Centre, Islington, London
- S & D Gallery, Kensington, London
- 11 Princelet Street Gallery. London, England
- Lemon Street Gallery, Truro
- Victoria Art Gallery, Bath
- Anthony Hepworth Fine Art, Bath and London
- Brian Sinfield Gallery, Burford
- The Kathmandu Arts Centre, London
- Bath Society of Artists, Victoria Art Gallery, Bath
- Royal West of England, Bristol
- Red Rag Gallery, Bath
- The Bath Prize, The Octagon, Bath
- Gallery leFort, Bath.
- The Bath Gallery, Bath
- Camden Fine Art, Bath
- Walcott Village Hall, Bath
- Museum Art Gallery, Devizes
- The Schoolhouse Gallery, Bath
- Quest Gallery, Bath
- The Rutland Gallery, Uppingham

=== Europe ===
- Rocca Paolina, Perugia, Umbria
- Galleria La Loggia, Sansepolcro, Tuscany
- Galleria La Loggia, Cortona, Tuscany
- Galleria Allesandrini, Sansepolcro, Tuscany
- Grantfield Gallery, Anghiari, Tuscany
- Grefti Gallery, Umbertide, Umbria
- Mostra Internazionale, Bastia, Umbria
- Palazzo Museo Bourbon del Monte, MSM Tiberina. Umbria
- Canova Art Gallery. San Giorgio a Cremona, Naples
- La Rocca di Umbertide, Umbria

=== United States ===
- Campbell-Thiebaud Gallery, San Francisco, California
- Winfield Gallery, Carmel, California
- Thomas Babeor and Co. La Jolla, California
- Weir Gallery, Berkeley, California
- Gallery Herbst Pavilion, Fort Mason, San Francisco, California
- Lucas Gallery, Princeton University, New Jersey
- The Museum of Modern Art, San Francisco, California
- Sesnon Gallery, UCSC, Santa Cruz, California
- Eloise Pickard Smith Gallery, UCSC, Santa Cruz, California
- Wurster Hall, University of California, Berkeley, California

== Publications ==
- William Balthazar Rose and Wende Elliott. Grant Wood’s Iowa. Countryman Press, New York: Norton & Co. 2013.
- William Rose. "Giorgio Morandi." Concrete Magazine. CED. Cal Berkeley, 1981.
- William Rose. 'Interview with Lars Lerup'. Berkeley Graduate Magazine. Cal Berkeley. 1982.
- William Rose. First Poems. Santa Cruz, California, 1977.

== Collectors ==
William has paintings in private collections all over the world, and has been collected over a thirty-year period. Michel Roux Jr. has purchased several paintings and displays them in his Le Gavroche Restaurant in Mayfair, and his Roux at Parliament Square restaurant in Westminster. He has profiled William's work in the magazine Seasons. While Michel Roux, Jr. is a dedicated and serious art collector owning works by Matisse, Chagall and others, he named William Balthazar Rose as his favourite painter in a Country Life interview.

American painter Wayne Thiebaud and his family are collectors of William's landscapes and figurative work.

Mr. and Mrs. Jeremy Clarkson recently purchased a painting at the charity auction in London for the Helen and Douglas House Hospice charity.

Other collectors of Rose's work include Roberto Vittori, Edward Lucie-Smith, Edward Chaney and Henry and Mary Bedingfeld.

== Reviews ==
=== 2017 ===
- Il Potere dei Cuochi, Vittorio Landi, Civilta della Tavola: Accademia Italiana della Cucina. N. 289, Gennaio 2017
- Chopping Block, Nicholas Usherwood. Galleries November issue.
- Collecting, John Duffield. Valley Life Anno XVi nr 139 Settembre 2017.
- The Devil made the Cook, Thomas Worthen, Jon Benington and Edward Chaney. Exhibition catalogue. The Victoria Art Gallery, Bath.

=== 2016 ===
- Summery Summary, John Duffield. Valley Life Anno XV nr 127 Settembre 2016.
- Nido dell’Aquila, the Comune di Monte Santa Maria Tiberina. July 2016

=== 2015 ===
- The Art of Fine Dining, Tamsin Pickeral. The Mayfair Magazine, October 2015.

=== 2014 ===
- War, Minimalism, Pop, Nicholas Usherwood. Galleries. September issue.
- Art of Eating, Editors. Crumbs. No. 29 November 2014.
- William Balthazar Rose: Catalogue, Brian Sinfield Gallery.

=== 2013 ===
- Bath Society of Artists; a History, Peter Davis. St. Ives Printing and Publishing Company.

=== 2012 ===
- The Mysterious Iconography of William Rose, Peter Davies. Catalogue essay. Brian Sinfield Gallery.
- In the Ascendant, Magazine editors. The Bath Magazine. Issue 120 September 2012.

=== 2011 ===
- My Favourite Painting. John McEwen. Country Life. 25 July 2011 featuring William Rose's "Red Shoes."
- Fiona Forman. Michel's Private Collection. Michel Roux's Seasons. Winter 2011.
- Zavarella e Boriosi. Artisti per l’Unita d’Italia-Impronta d’autore. Editebro Edizioni. Perugia, Italy. 2012.

=== 2009 ===
- Tradition and the Individual, Edward Chaney, The Jackdaw, July/August 2009.
- Tradition and an Individual Talent, Exhibition catalogue, text by Edward Chaney, Gallery leFort, Bath, England.

=== 2008 ===
- Khulla Dhoka: The Open Door Exhibition, Exhibition Catalogue. The Kathmandu Arts Centre.

=== 2007 ===
- William Balthazar Rose: Sinfonia di Cappelli, Exhibition Catalogue, essays by Paolo Turcis and Sean Gaston, analysis by Paolo Turcis, Serena Burroni and Federica Tiripelli. La Loggia Casa Editrice, Sansepolcro, Italy.
- The Creative Spirit of William Rose, Simoni Bandini, Valley Life, no. 34. June 2007.

=== 2004 ===
- William Rose: Images of Bath and Italy, Exhibition Catalogue, introduction by Jon Benington, curator, Victoria Art Gallery, Bath, England.
- Art and Exhibitions, The Bath Magazine, Issue 26, November 2004.
- Da DeChirico a Ferroni, Giovanni Faccenda, La Loggia Casa Editrice, Sansepolcro, Italy.

=== 1996 ===
- A Passion for Art, Charles Baldridge, La Jolla Village News (12 July).

=== 1994 ===
- But what are those Chefs Cooking, Jonathan Saville, San Diego Reader. 17 November 1994.

=== 1993 ===
- Contemporary Landscapes Bask in Local Gallery Spotlight, Marcia Tanner, San Francisco Chronicle.

=== 1992 ===
- Introductions, Frank Cebulski, Artweek, vol. 23, no. 21 (6 August).
- Introducing Art by Lesser-Knowns, Carol Fowler, Contra Costa Times (11 July).

=== 1991 ===
- Presenting Ideas, Thomas Fisher, Progressive Architecture (June).

=== 1989 ===
- Eleven at 185 Dawn Utsumi, The Real Nassau Weekly, Princeton, New Jersey.

=== 1984 ===
- Portfolio John Parman Editor, College of Environmental Design, University of California, Berkeley.

=== 1982 ===
- Windows, Concrete Magazine. Volume 14. Issue 1. CED. Cal Berkeley.

== Media ==
- William Balthazar Rose, The Martin Evans Show, BBC Somerset, 21 October 2017.
- Cooks: William Balthazar Rose at Grefti Gallery & Grantfield Gallery, Italy. A film by Corinne Minore, 2016.
- William Balthazar Rose at the Bishop’s Palace, a film by Christopher Donovan, Bath, England, 2015.
- William Balthazar Rose at the Bishop's Palace, BBC Radio Somerset, Emma Britten.
- Grant Wood's Iowa. Iowa Public Radio, Talk of Iowa with Charity Nebbe, 2014.
- William Balthazar Rose: Sinfonia di Capelli by Corinne Minore, Galleria LaLoggia, Sansepolcro, Tuscany. Televised on several occasions throughout central Italy, 2007.
- Images of Bath and Italy, Christopher Donovan, Bath, England, 2004.
- Puzzle a film made to commemorate the collective painting of twelve artists in Anghiari, Tuscany.
