= Lee Rose (rugby league) =

Australian rugby league footballer

Lee Rose (4 July 1924 – 20 October 1976) was a rugby league footballer in the New South Wales Rugby League (NSWRL).

Rose played in the seasons 1946–48, the centre made 28 appearances for his club side Eastern Suburbs. In the 1947 season Rose was Eastern Suburbs leading try soccer.

His only representative appearance was for Sydney in 1947.

== Sources ==
- Whiticker, Alan & Hudson, Glen (2006) The Encyclopedia of Rugby League Players, Gavin Allen Publishing, Sydney
