= Kevin Rose (disambiguation) =

Kevin Rose is an American television and Internet personality.

Kevin Rose may also refer to:

- Kevin Rose (Australian rules footballer) (born 1939), Australian sportsman
- Kevin Rose (footballer, born 1960), English football goalkeeper
