= Jim Rose =

Jim Rose may refer to:

- Jim Rose, founder of the Jim Rose Circus
- Jim Rose (journalist) (1909–1999), publisher and founder director of the International Press Institute
- Jim Rose (sports anchor) (born 1953), sports anchor who currently works for WLS-TV
- Jim Rose (basketball) (1949–2009), American basketball player
- Jim Rose (artist) (1966–2023), American sculptor

== See also ==
- James Rose (disambiguation)
