= John Rose (cricketer) =

English cricketer

Personal information
- Full name: John Rose
- Born: 24 December 1853; Warwick, Warwickshire, England
- Died: 6 November 1920 (aged 66); Tiddington, Warwickshire, England
- Batting: Right-handed
- Bowling: Right-arm slow
- Role: Occasional wicket-keeper

Domestic team information
- Years: Team
- 1878: Surrey

Career statistics
Competition	First-class
Matches	1
Runs scored	0
Batting average	0.00
100s/50s	–/–
Top score	0
Balls bowled	8
Wickets	1
Bowling average	2.00
5 wickets in innings	–
10 wickets in match	–
Best bowling	1/2
Catches/stumpings	–/–
- Source: Cricinfo, 20 October 2012

John Rose (24 December 1853 – 6 November 1920) was an English cricketer. Rose was a right-handed batsman who bowled right-arm slow and who occasionally fielded as a wicket-keeper. He was born at Warwick, Warwickshire.

Rose made a single first-class appearance for Surrey against Yorkshire in 1878. Yorkshire won the toss and elected to bat first, making 309 all out, with Rose taking a single wicket in the innings, that of Allen Hill. In response, Surrey were dismissed in their first-innings for just 78, with Rose dismissed for a duck by George Ulyett. Forced to follow-on in their second-innings, Surrey were dismissed for 127, with Rose again dismissed for a duck, this time by Harry Pearson. Yorkshire won the match by an innings and 104 runs. This was his only major appearance for the county.

He died at Tiddington, Warwickshire, on 6 November 1920.
