= Stephanie Rose (model) =

Stephanie Rose is a Filipino-Australia beauty titleholder, model, actress and philanthropist. She was crowned Miss Philippines-Australia in October 2011, she has since then gone on to modeling, acting and active charity work.

== Biography ==
Stephanie Rose was born in Australia to a Filipino mother Chelsea and a Scottish father Timothy. She is the eldest of two siblings, Liam and Lachlan.

Rose began modelling at 17 and was given her big break in April 2012 during a public relations tour in Manila. She made several television appearances on Eat Bulaga as a guest judge, Showtime! And Wil Time Big Time. She was discovered by Vic Del Rosario, CEO of Viva Films Philippines and was offered a 5-year movie contract.

She stars as the leading lady in Marvin Ong's film, Ayoko Na, directed by Carlo Alvarez.
