= Hilly Rose =

American radio personality

- Born: 1926; United States
- Died: December 27, 2017 (aged 91); San Francisco, California, U.S.
- Occupation: Radio personality
- Spouse: Mary Shepper Rose
- Children: 4, including Roger and Judd

Hilly Rose (1926 – December 27, 2017) was an American radio personality and a pioneer of the talk radio format. His professional career spanned seven decades. He was inducted into the Bay Area Radio Hall of Fame as a "Living Legend" pioneer broadcaster in 2016.

== Early career ==
Rose began working as a child radio actor in Chicago during the 1940s, appearing on shows such as Ma Perkins and The First Nighter Program. His career was interrupted by military service, but he returned to the air on KCBS in San Francisco hosting one of the earliest talk radio programs. As a reporter for the station, he also landed a rare interview with the Beatles in 1964.

== Career highlights ==
Rose has hosted talk radio programs on KFI, KABC, and KMPC in Los Angeles as well as KGO-AM and KCBS in San Francisco. He won the California State Fair award for investigative reporting.

During the 1983 Beirut barracks bombing, Rose solicited AT&T to build a communications infrastructure so that troops could contact their families.

Rose authored But That’s Not What I Called About, a book with many autobiographical stories and biographies on many of the major pioneers and leaders of talk radio prior to network syndication.

In the mid-1990s, Rose developed a series of radio shows about marine life for the Monterey Bay Aquarium in Monterey, California.

In 1999 Hilly guest-hosted Coast to Coast AM, often running a Y2K theme. His guests included such "End-of-the-World" figures as notable survivalists, hackers responsible for stopping all Amtrak trains, builders of fallout shelters, and others. Hilly would later become an occasional fill-in for later host George Noory.

== Paranormal ==
Rose began covering the paranormal in the 1970s while on KFI in Los Angeles. He was an early pioneer of Internet broadcasting with a paranormal talk show called The I-Files. His paranormal investigations provided a large volume of content for the early years of satellite radio, with 500 programs airing on Sirius. These programs are available through Fate.

== Death ==
Rose died of natural causes on December 27, 2017, in San Francisco. He was 91. He was survived by his wife Mary Shepper Rose and children Adam, Roger and Patricia. His oldest son, now deceased, was ABC-TV news anchor Judd Rose.

== See also ==
- Art Bell
- George Noory
- Whitley Strieber
