= Bernard Rose =

Bernard Rose may refer to:

- Bernard Rose (director), British film director
- Bernard Rose (musician) (1916–1996), British organist and composer
