= Peter Rose (author) =

American author and food historian (born 1939)

Peter G. Rose (born 25 February 1939) is an American author and food historian. She has published eight books, mainly on the topic of food in colonial times, especially among the Dutch in the Hudson Valley.

Rose was born in Utrecht, educated in the Netherlands and Switzerland and emigrated to the United States in 1964. Through the New York Council for Humanities she has presented at the Smithsonian Institution, the National Gallery of Art and the Culinary Institute of America.

== Awards ==
She received the Alice P. Kenney Award for her research and writing on the food customs and diet of the Dutch settlers in New Netherland.
