= Desrosiers =

Desrosiers is a French surname with several variants. Notable people with the surname include:

- Alain Desrosières (1940–2013), French statistician
- Arthur Desrosiers (1884–1951), Canadian doctor and politician
- Camille DesRosiers (1928–2016), Canadian Roman Catholic priest in Polynesia
- David Desrosiers, Canadian bass guitarist
- Édouard Desrosiers (born 1934), Canadian singer and politician
- Dennis Desrosiers (born 1949), Canadian ice hockey player
- Gérard Desrosiers (1919–2016), Canadian doctor and library founder
- Jacques Desrosiers (1938–1996), Canadian singer and actor
- Jake DeRosier (1880–1913), Canadian motorcycle racer
- Julien Desrosiers (born 1980), French ice hockey player
- Léo-Paul Desrosiers (1896–1967), Canadian writer and journalist
- Marie-Michèle Desrosiers (born 1950), Canadian singer
- Matt Desrosiers, American ice-hockey coach
- Nathalie Des Rosiers (born 1959), Canadian lawyer, academic, and politician
- Philippe Desrosiers (born 1995), Canadian ice hockey player
- Robert Desrosiers (born 1953), Canadian dancer, choreographer and actor
- Sylvie Desrosiers (born 1954), Canadian writer
