= Clive Rose =

Clive Rose may refer to:

- Clive Rose (cricketer) (born 1989), Australian cricketer
- Clive Rose (diplomat) (1921–2019), British diplomat
