= James Rose =

James Rose may refer to:

- James Rose, 23rd of Kilravock (1820–1909), British soldier and Lord Lieutenant of Nairn
- James C. Rose (1913–1991), landscape architect and author
- James Allen Rose (1935–2013), American model boat builder and wood craftsman
- James Rose (footballer) (born 1996), Australian rules footballer
- James Rose (bishop) (1655–1733), Scottish Episcopal clergyman
- James Rose (Australian politician) (1849–1939), Australian politician
- James A. Rose (1850–1912), American politician and educator
- James Franklin Rose (born 1945), American convicted murderer

== See also ==
- Jim Rose (disambiguation)
