= Anthony Rose =

Anthony Rose may refer to:

- Anthony Rose (boxer) (born 1965), Jamaican boxer
- Anthony Rose (wine), English wine writer
- Anthony Rose (businessman) (born 1964), English technologist and entrepreneur
- Anthony Red Rose (born 1962), Jamaican singjay
