= Jack Rose =

Jack Rose may refer to:

- Jack Rose (cocktail), a classic cocktail
- Jack Rose (colonial administrator) (1917–2009), RAF fighter pilot and British colonial administrator of Cayman Islands
- Jack Rose (footballer) (born 1995), English professional footballer
- Jack Rose (gambler) (1875–1947), American gambler and underworld figure in New York City
- Jack Rose (guitarist) (1971–2009), American guitarist
- Jack Rose (screenwriter) (1911–1995), Russian-born American screenwriter
- Jack Rose (colonel) (1876–1973), South African chemist and army officer
- Jack Rose (character), character from Just Dance.

== See also ==
- John Rose (disambiguation)
