= Michel Rosier =

Michel Rosier (1950–2004) was a French historian of economics.

He was a professor at the University of Paris-Est Marne-la-Vallée. He was also an active member of PHARE (Pôle d’histoire et d’analyse des représentations économiques) at the Paris 1 Panthéon-Sorbonne University.

== Works ==
- L'Etat expérimentateur. Paris: Presses universitaires de France, 1993.
- (ed. with Lucien Gillard) François Simiand (1873-1935): sociologie, histoire, économie. Amsterdam: Ed. des Archives contemporaines, 1996.
