= Gregory Rose =

Gregory or Greg Rose may refer to:

- Gregory G. Rose (born 1955), Australian-born American cryptographer
- Gregory Rose (musician) (born 1948), conductor, composer, arranger and music director
- Perfect (musician) (Greg Rose, born 1980), Jamaican reggae singer
