= Christine Rose =

Christine Rose may refer to:

- Christine Rose (politician), New Zealand politician
- Cristine Rose (born 1951), American actress
- Christine Brooke-Rose (1923–2012), British writer and literary critic
- Christine Rose (dredge), a mining dredge seen on the reality television series Bering Sea Gold
