= Eileen Rose (artist) =

New Zealand artist, designer and teacher (1909-2003)

Eileen O'Malley
- Born: Eileen Knox Rose; 6 September 1909; Dunedin, New Zealand
- Died: 21 July 2003 (aged 93)
- Spouse: Clifford John O'Malley (d. 1995)
- Relatives: James Hight (uncle)

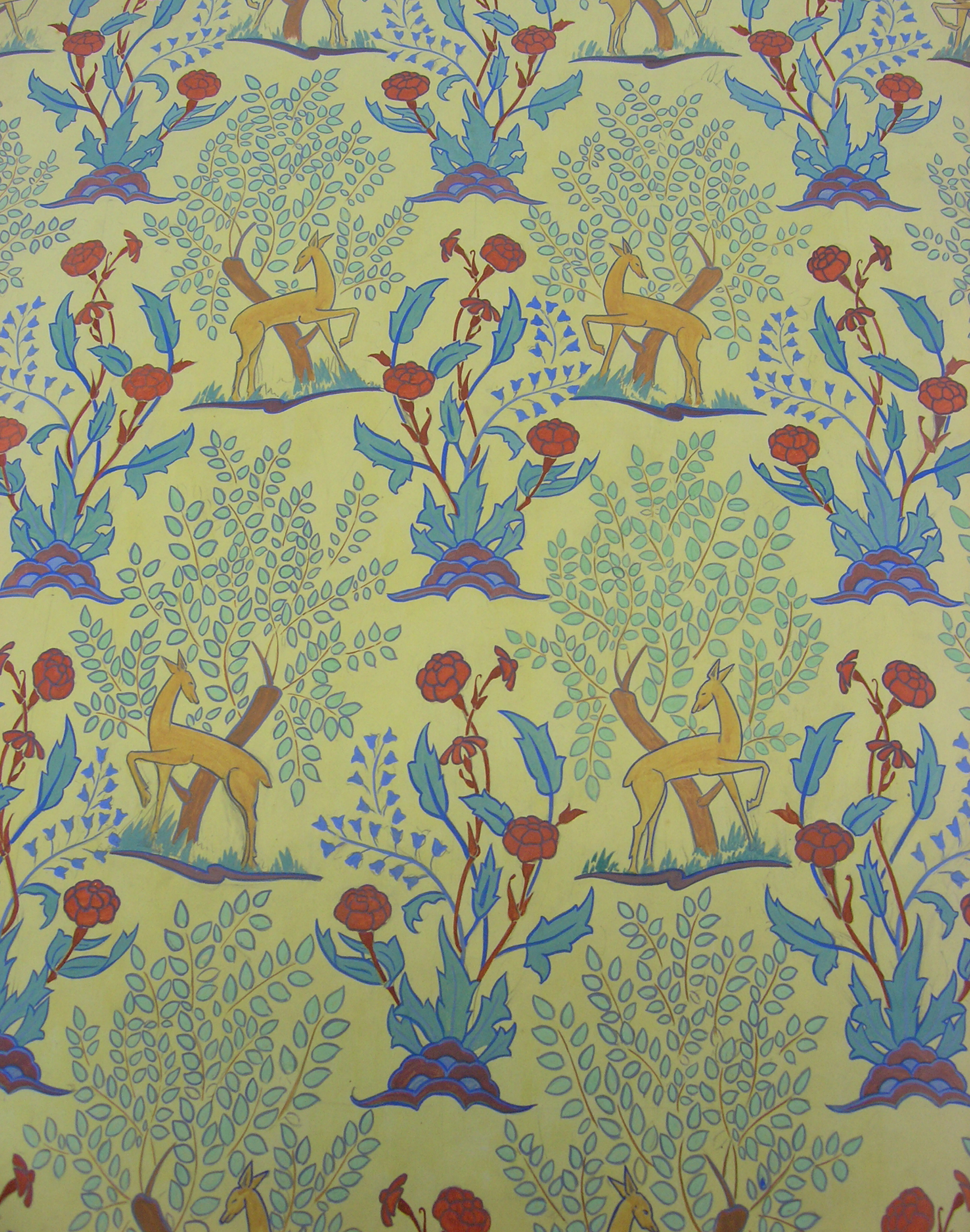
Art deco wallpaper designed by Rose

Eileen Knox O'Malley (née Rose, 6 September 1909 – 21 July 2003) was a New Zealand art teacher and artist. Some of her design work is held in the Auckland War Memorial Museum.

== Biography ==
Rose was born in Dunedin, New Zealand, on 6 September 1909, the daughter of Mary Dorothea Rose (née Green) and Arthur Brooke Rose. Her mother's sister, Maggie, was married to James Hight. Rose moved to Christchurch and enrolled in 1929 at the School of Arts at Canterbury College, graduating in 1937 with a diploma in fine arts. During this time she was friends with Betty Curnow and Rita Angus. She continued her art studies at the Slade School of Fine Art in London, and in Paris, France.

Rose returned to New Zealand in August 1939 and, after a few months as a temporary teacher at Christchurch Girls' High School and Christchurch West High School, became an art teacher at Wellington Technical College and the Correspondence School. She taught embroidery and also practised silversmithing and jewellery making. Her complex design patterns, such as the example in the Auckland War Memorial Museum, could have been created for either textile or wallpaper design.

Rose married artist Clifford John O'Malley, who was a contemporary at the School of Arts in Christchurch. She died on 21 July 2003, and was buried at Makara Cemetery, Wellington. She had been predeceased by her husband, Cliff, and son, John James O'Malley, who both died in 1995.
