= Rose Creative Strategies =

Advertising and public relations agency

- Industry: Marketing, Public Relations
- Founded: 1984; 42 years ago
- Founder: John Rose
- Headquarters: Boston, United States, Moscow, Russian Federation
- Area served: Worldwide
- Number of employees: 50 (2017)
- Website: rose.ru

Rose Creative Strategies is an advertising and public relations agency operating as a subsidiary of Rose Marketing Ltd. Founded in 1984, the agency began as a US-based firm that later expanded into the Soviet market, providing marketing and communications services for international companies entering Russia. The company offers integrated services including public relations, digital marketing, brand strategy, and social media management.

The agency has worked with brands like Filippo Berio, Lavazza, Lexus, Logitech, Neffos (TP-Link), Coca-Cola, Citibank, Officine Panerai, PepsiCo, Pfizer, Volvo, and GlaxoSmithKline.

== History ==
Rose Creative Strategies was founded in the United States in 1984 by John Rose. John is a founder of the Russia Chapter of the International Advertising Association (IAA). In 1989, the agency opened an office in Moscow, where it began providing advertising and communications services for international companies entering the Soviet market.

Early work included campaigns for Coca-Cola and Fanta, among some of the first advertising efforts developed for Western brands in Russia. In 1991, the agency produced a Coca-Cola billboard near Moscow's Paveletsky railway station, noted as one of the first outdoor advertisements for the brand in the country. During the early 1990s, the firm also created Russia's first scratch-card promotion for Sony products and contributed to outdoor campaigns for Baskin Robbins.

Since 1991 Galina Savina has served as the CEO. Galina Savina held the post of IAA Russia chapter President from 1993 to 1999. Currently, she continues her activity as vice-president.She was several times included into the list of "1000 most professional managers of Russia".

== Recognition ==
In 1995 the agency created an advertising campaign for Stresstabs that included an award-winning billboard featuring a mannequin posed as a businessman about to jump. The billboard said: "Stop. Take Stresstabs". The single billboard resulted in massive publicity and became the finalist of London International Advertising Awards — London International Advertising Awards.

In 2015 the agency was included in the international rating of the leading communication agencies of the world according to The Holmes Report and the International association of PR consultants. In 2015 the agency opened its office in Havana, Cuba.

Today, Rose is a diverse communications group providing integrated marketing services.

== See also ==
- Advantage Solutions
