= Stephanie Rose (painter) =

American painter

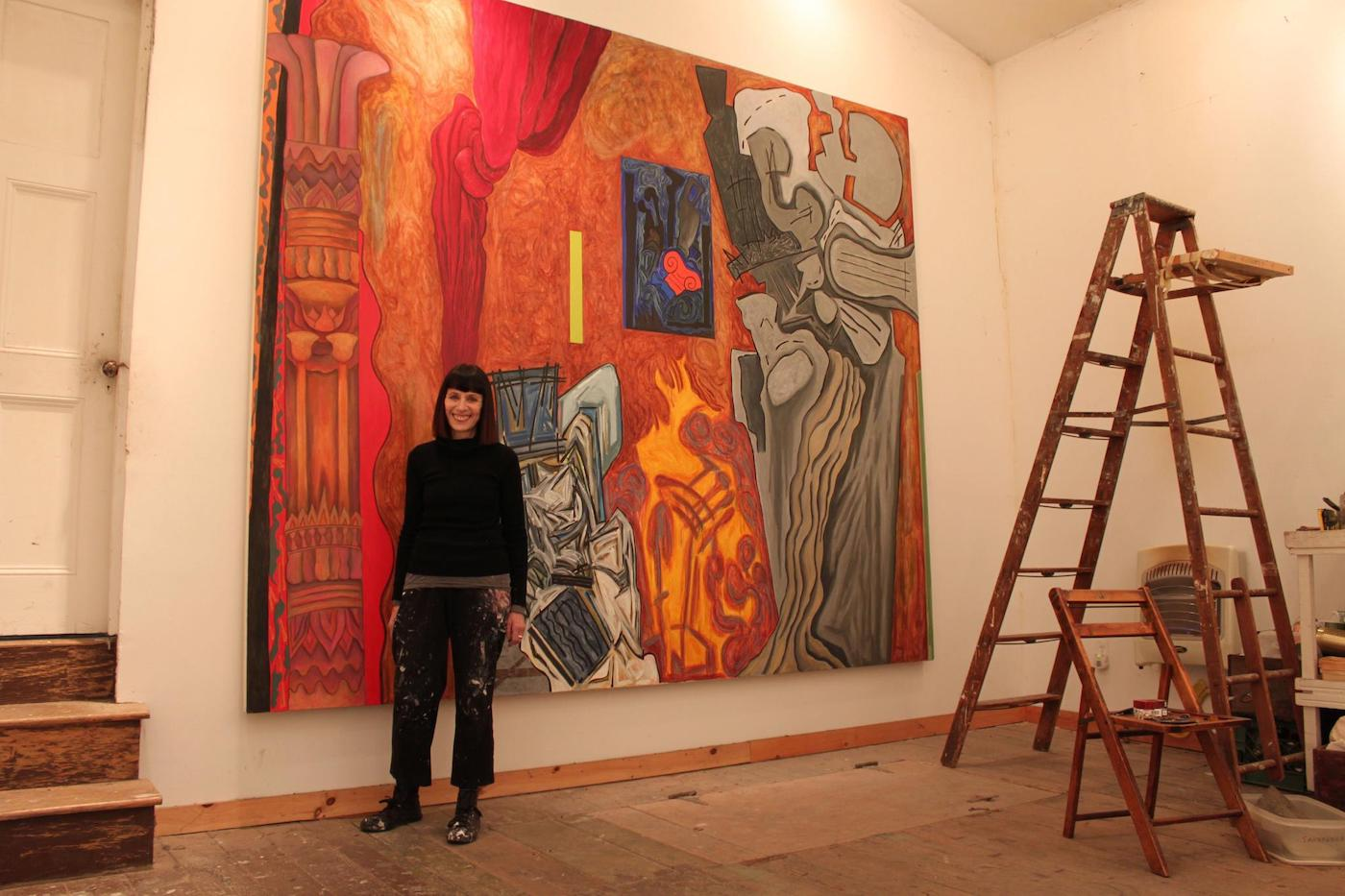
Portrait of Stephanie Rose in her studio by Veronica Cross (2013)

Stephanie Rose (April 23, 1943, in New York City – March 23, 2023, in Basel, Switzerland), was an American painter known for dramatic non-narrative abstract paintings composed of diverse passages including representational imagery and for portraiture in which the highly recognizable subjects appear in settings related to her work in abstraction; both, she has said, involve a "combination of historical and existential perspectives".

Rose’s reputation was established as an abstract painter; her work in portraiture began late in her career in 1996. Exhibitions of her work typically include both modes of painting of which she has remarked, "Overall, the pivotal aspect for communicating meaning in my work is the investment of a theatrical sense of psychological presence in the paintings."

James K. Kettlewell, (curator emeritus, The Hyde Collection, Glens Falls, NY; professor emeritus of the history of art, Skidmore College) said of her in 2012:

"The extraordinary art of Stephanie Rose occupies a critical place in Modern/Postmodern art history. Utterly original, her style effects a perfect synthesis between these two opposing philosophies of art….. Content is intimately bound to form. These paintings, like the plays of Shakespeare, can never be exhausted – they are constantly renewed as different aspects reveal themselves to the experienced observer. Perhaps the most "Old Master" aspect of Stephanie Rose’s work is the quite delectable surface treatment. Her rich brushwork can be related to the paintings of Titian or of Rembrandt, or to the brushed metal of David Smith’s late sculptures in stainless steel. In her paintings Stephanie Rose achieves Cezanne’s proclaimed ambition; she has created a great art that is ‘like the art of the museums.’ In any museum it could hold its own against any art of the past."

== Background and education ==
Rose grew up in Manhattan where she graduated from the Calhoun School in 1960. She received her B.F.A., B.S. and B.A. degrees from Skidmore College in 1964. Her first and most significant mentor was David Smith, to whom she had been introduced in the early 1960s. Henry Geldzahler, whom she had known since high school, was the person most instrumental in the start of her professional career.

== Career ==
Rose's exhibition history began in 1973 and includes solo shows in New York at Betty Cuningham Gallery, the Dactyl Foundation for the Arts and Humanities, E.M. Donahue Gallery, Getler/Pall Gallery, Susan Caldwell Inc., the SoHo Playhouse and fiction/nonfiction; and elsewhere at Apel Galeri, Istanbul, Moss/Chumley Gallery, Dallas, and in Chicago at Van Straaten Gallery and One Illinois Exhibition Space, among others. Regionally, she has had solo exhibitions in Hudson at Nicole Fiacco Gallery, Sarah Y. Rentchler Gallery, Carrie Haddad Gallery, Studio 249 Ltd. and the Hudson Opera House.

A solo museum exhibition of Rose's work at the Albany Institute of History & Art titled "The Eternal Return" ran from August 25, 2012, through January 27, 2013. The show consisted of twenty-five paintings installed in three galleries in the museum; the exhibition catalogue includes texts by Elizabeth C. Baker, Carter Ratcliff and James K. Kettlewell. The 2012-2013 Art in America Annual Guide included the show in its Museum Preview section; and a review by Tom Breidenbach was published in February 2013 in Art in America.

Rose's paintings are included in the permanent collections of museums including The Neuberger Museum of Art, The University of Iowa Museum of Art, The Denver Art Museum, The Tang Museum, Skidmore College, The Castellani Art Museum, The Reading Public Museum and The Albany Institute of History & Art among others; and her work is also represented internationally in numerous public collections. In 2018, Rose's portrait of the author Jaime Manrique was acquired by The Museum of the City of New York. Exhibition catalogue texts, reviews and articles on her work have been published with frequency in journals such as Art in America, Artforum, ARTnews, Arts Magazine and Tema Celeste by noted writers including Carter Ratcliff, Brooks Adams, John Ash, Eleanor Heartney, Eileen Myles, Marjorie Welish, William Zimmer, Dan Cameron, Harold Haydon and Ellen Schwartz Harris, among others; and her work has been included in the Art in America International Slide Survey of Contemporary Art (2000, 1995, 1993). Writing on Rose's work has appeared in leading newspapers in Dallas, Buffalo, Chicago, Istanbul, Hudson, New York and New York City.

Rose has been awarded the 2014 Gottlieb Foundation Individual Support Grant; the Invitational Travel Grant of the U.S. Consulate General of Istanbul, Turkey (2000); the New School for Social Research Faculty Development Fund Grant (1991); and has twice received the Ludwig Vogelstein Foundation Grant (1979, 1976).

She has held graduate and undergraduate teaching positions at Parsons School of Design, The Pennsylvania Academy of Fine Arts, SUNY Buffalo, Bank Street College of Education, Pratt Institute and The Studio Program, Empire State College at SUNY in New York.

Rose has been a Visiting Artist, Lecturer and Guest Critic at the Albright-Knox Art Gallery, The Brooklyn Museum, Bennington College, Bard College, Yale School of Art, SUNY at Purchase College, Skidmore College, Tyler Graduate School of Fine Art, U.S. Consulate General of Istanbul, Turkey, Altos de Chavón, La Escuela de Diseño in the Dominican Republic, Syracuse University, University of Dallas, The Albany Institute of History & Art, Rhode Island School of Design, Otis Art Institute in Los Angeles, Pratt Institute and Brown University.

== Work ==
=== 1960s and 1970s ===
In the early 1960s while at Skidmore, Rose made paintings in the manner of Abstract Expressionism, which marks a notable early phase in the evolution of her style. On her return to New York after college in the mid-1960s, she made large-scale hard edge abstract paintings, which by the early 1970s shifted into lyrical abstraction. Through the 1970s, Rose's paintings tended towards a romantic sort of Minimalism, and were vertical, dark and monolithic; a renewed take on her earlier work of the mid-1960s. By 1980, Rose's work, though less austere was still reductive; and while apparently formal in essence, the paintings were also invested with the "theatrical sense of psychological presence".

=== 1980s ===
In 1981, Rose began to develop an iconography which, in the course of that decade, became the basis for her mature work. The paintings, composed of disparate divisions and passages, painted in characteristically quite different ways nevertheless worked in concert. She has said of those works:

"I was really thinking about the fundamentally disjunctive nature of reality, both the mundane and the eidetic, as seen in sleep." An article by Mary Lee Thompson was published in ARTS magazine on the work exhibited in 1982 at Getler/Pall in New York in which Thompson said: “All of Rose’s paintings have startling contrasts within them…Like jumbling exotic sensations of culture shock these paintings have riotous colors, slashing structures, and frenetic lines that should not commingle, but they do. That they achieve a balance of such overwhelming energies is astonishing.”

In an article in ARTS magazine in 1985, Dan Cameron wrote: “Her newest paintings are her most original to date, and it is clear from the best works in this selection that her range of concerns has broadened tremendously over a relatively short amount of time ……….Perhaps it is Rose’s tendency towards a enforced dreaminess, a give-and-take between sheer tactility and sheer drama, which is now coming to the forefront of her concerns.”

Around that time, Rose's work began to involve a pointed consideration of the possibilities of doubling and tripling the meaning of images. Eleanor Heartney, writing in Art in America, said of her 1987 show at fiction/nonfiction in New York: “However interpreted, all the paintings suggest an engagement between Apollonian and Dionysian forces. By refusing to resolve the conflict, or privilege one impulse over the other, Rose stakes out a position in which the artist acts as mediator between realms and varieties of experience.”

By 1989, Rose's paintings demonstrate her increasing historically minded point of view.

In her catalogue essay for Rose's show that year at E.M. Donohue Gallery in New York, Eleanor Heartney wrote:

“While many of her colleagues take the failure of art to provide absolute answers as an occasion for mourning or clever cynicism, Rose chooses instead to demonstrate how much can still be said with the language of painting. Her work cuts across distinctions between Modernism and Postmodernism and suggests that the “Tradition of the New” may encompass both as living productive tendencies within the continuing saga of 20th century art.”

=== 1990s ===
Rose's work in her 1991 show at Donahue expands her approach to historicity. In response to those paintings, Marjorie Welish wrote the following in Tema Celeste:

“Among the themes nurtured through the long history of art is that of the Sacra Conversazione, wherein under noble auspices the divine approaches the human in a space symmetrically governed, light-filled and calm. To this tradition, Stephanie Rose contributes a fecund perversion, for as her recent paintings show, she is master of the profane conversation……….Distinguishing Rose’s paintings from so many cynical compilations of style is the sustained, gutsy imagination brought to painterly process. The given motifs do not serve as pretexts for stylistic reference – shown to be bogus – but are assimilated to a felt and transforming creativity. It is by this means that the artist declares herself culturally responsible.”

In a review in Art in America of that 1991 exhibition, Eileen Myles wrote: “Rose seems to me to focus on the “phrasing” of art, the frequency at which certain kinds of tropes can come in or, once arrived, how they hold their place. All kinds of signs, abstract and otherwise, have equal weight. Each canvas functions like a stage on which many things can happen.” Myles also noted of one painting, now in the Permanent Collection of the Neuberger Museum: “Time-Step comes across as a great historical painting.”

John Ash writing in Artforum of the paintings in the “Still Pictures" series exhibited in 1993 at E.M. Donohue in New York said: “Stephanie Rose’s “Still Pictures”, 1993, are, first of all, a reminder that in terms of technique she is simply one of the best painters around. Luckily Rose’s technical facility is at the service of a flamboyant imagination and a disciplined intelligence.”

Rose's work in portraiture began in 1996 and the first show of this work was installed at the Dactyl Foundation in 1999. Of this show, Gerard McCarthy, writing in Art in America, said: “Each subject stares out at the viewer in a way that conveys the moment of encountering a weighty persona with the freshness and ephemerality of a glance, but the result is elaborately worked and structurally complex.”

=== 2000s ===
In the 2000s, Stephanie Rose continued her work in both abstraction and portraiture; both modes of painting are typically included in her shows. Writing in Art in America about her solo exhibition in April–May, 2006 at Nicole Fiacco Gallery in Hudson, New York, Carter Ratcliff said that the images in the paintings are “major players in her theater of extreme self-consciousness. The action is in the interchange between a painting’s disparate parts, and of course there is no single denouement because every element interacts so complicatedly with every other…..Yet light always triumphs brilliantly, as the painter’s wit induces even the most difficult forms to join the pictorial drama.”

Further writing on Rose's work by Ratcliff appeared in the exhibition catalogue for the show at The Albany Institute of History & Art, which is titled "Stephanie Rose: Upstage" because:

"In the theater of Rose’s art, everyone is always trying to upstage everyone else—or, rather, every image tries, tirelessly, to upstage every other. This is the twist, the amazing thing: they all succeed.” In addressing her painterly engagement with the historical past, Carter Ratcliff concluded: “For this is what true artists do: they immerse themselves in history, each reinventing a personal and therefore entirely relevant version of the past, and they live this past as if it were present… In these paintings of Rose’s…past and present are unified, but not on equal terms. The present wins out, and that is why these paintings are so vividly alive, now and for us, in the moment of coming face to face with them.”

Also in the exhibition catalogue for this show, Betsy Baker wrote: "Rose’s portraits represent just one aspect of her broader career, but in their painterly strength, pictorial and imaginative breadth, and multiple productive tensions between contemporary concerns and the past, constitute a complex and highly individual addition to this thriving contemporary genre." In Art in America, Tom Breidenbach remarked that:

"...[The imagery] in Rose's paintings seem to reference our ancient as well as our primitive pasts. They balance our vast cultural inheritance, including its alternately utopian and apocalyptic potentialities, with the fragile perspective of the solitary individual left to variously experience it. Many of Rose's subjects are artists themselves, which plays into the self-referential quality of these portraits. Their theatricality seems born from recognition - both ludic and sympathetic - of the extent to which each of us is an actor, or a social construct. If artifice itself appears as Rose's primary theme, it is the means by which she maintains her esthetic encounter with the all-sustaining if elusive incidence of the genuine."
