= Laura Vlasak Nolen =

American opera singer

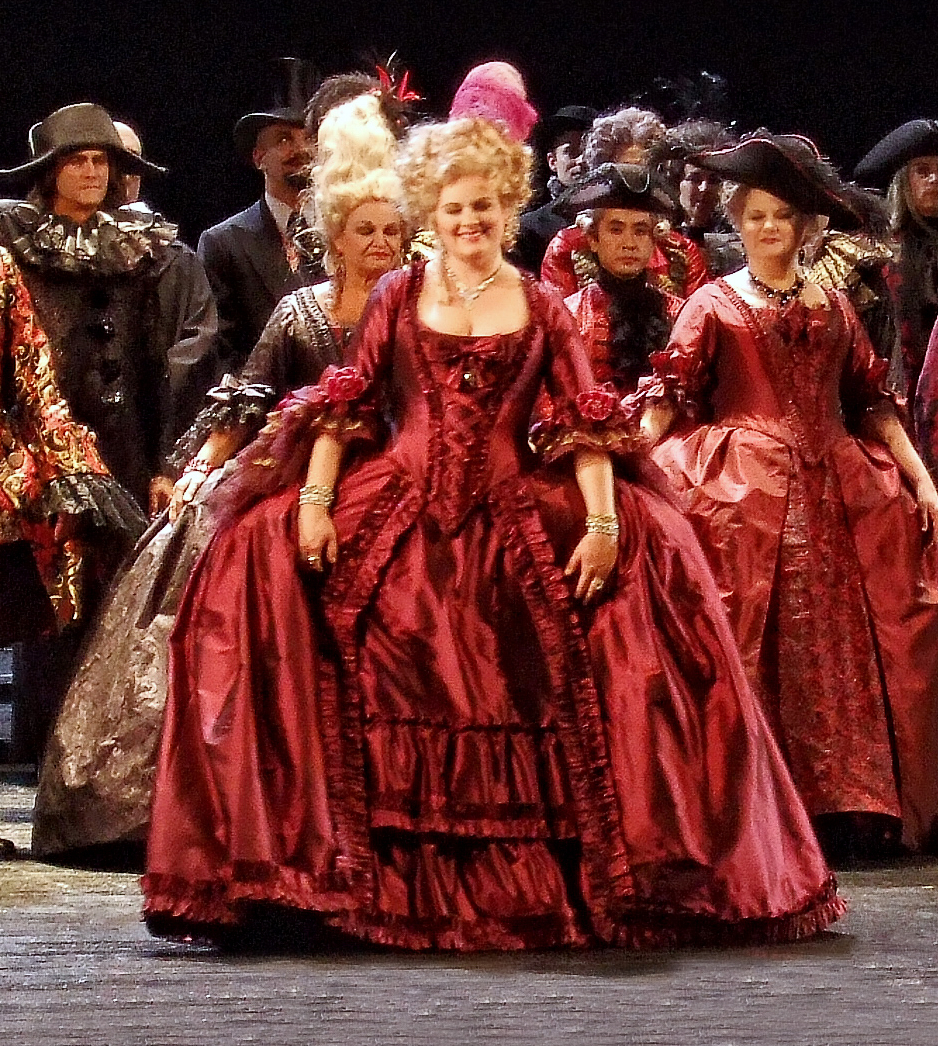
Nolen bows after a performance of The Tales of Hoffmann at the Metropolitan Opera in 2009.

Laura Vlasak Nolen (born January 13, 1977) is an American mezzo-soprano.

Born in Dallas, Nolen attended Naaman Forest High School in Garland, during which time she was invited to participate in the Texas All-State Choir. She received a degree in vocal performance at Texas Tech University; for her graduate studies she attended the Jacobs School of Music, where she was a pupil of Costanza Cuccaro. Her professional debut came with Cleveland Opera, when she sang the Third Lady in The Magic Flute. On January 7, 2008, she bowed at the Metropolitan Opera as Waltraute in Die Walküre. She was reengaged for the following season, returning as Waltraute and singing Inez in Il trovatore; she was also booked to cover Giulietta in The Tales of Hoffmann, the Countess in The Nose, and the Second Maidservant in Elektra. Other companies with which Nolen has performed include New York City Opera, Madison Opera, Lyric Opera of Kansas City, Dallas Opera, and Glimmerglass Opera, for whom she performed the title role in Giulio Cesare in 2008. At the Wexford Festival that same year she appeared as Dorotea in Tutti in maschera. In 2011 she appeared as Ines opposite the Maria of Barbara Quintiliani in Maria Padilla with Opera Boston. In concert she has appeared with such groups as The Washington Chorus and the Honolulu Symphony Orchestra.
