= Sondra Gair =

American journalist

- Born: 1924; Cicero, Illinois
- Died: March 25, 1994 (aged 69–70); Chicago
- Children: 3
- Presenting career
- Show: Midday with Sondra Gair
- Station: WBEZ-FM
- Country: United States of America

Sondra Gair (1924 – May 25, 1994) was an American veteran broadcast journalist best known for her public-affairs talk show on Chicago Radio.

== Career ==
Gair began her radio career in the 1940s, appearing in soap operas, dramas and comedy shows such as WGN radio's Theater of the Air, the Colgate Comedy Hour, Ma Perkins, Bachelor's Children, Woman in White and Corliss Archer. She became the star of a CBS show titled Meet Miss Sherlock, about a female version of Sherlock Holmes. Gair's interest was more towards news reporting and in 1975 she joined WBEZ-FM in Chicago, working mainly as an interview shows, which later led to her starting the mid-day show she became known for.

== Personal life ==
Gair was born in Cicero, Illinois, and grew up in Chicago. She has one daughter and two sons.

== Death ==
Gair died of complications from breast cancer.

== Awards ==
- 1988 Silver Dome Award for Excellence in Broadcasting.
- 1989 United Nations Award for Broadcasting.
- Chicago Journalism Hall of Fame and was given The Woman of Influence Award.
