= John Rose (fl. 1399) =

English politician

John Rose (fl. 1399) was an English politician.

He was a Member (MP) of the Parliament of England for Totnes in 1399.
