= Richard J. Rose =

American psychologist and behavior geneticist

- Born: March 19, 1935 (age 91)
- Education: University of Minnesota
- Known for: Twin studies
- Awards: Dobzhansky Award from the Behavior Genetics Association (2007)
- Scientific career
- Fields: Behavior genetics Molecular genetics Psychology
- Workplaces: Indiana University Bloomington
- Thesis: Preliminary study of three indicants of arousal: measurement, interrelationships, and clinical correlates (1964)
- Doctoral advisor: David T. Lykken

Richard J. Rose (born March 19, 1935) is an American psychologist and behavioral geneticist. He is Emeritus Professor of Psychological & Brain Sciences at Indiana University Bloomington and of Medical & Molecular Genetics at the Indiana University School of Medicine. He is also a visiting professor at the University of Helsinki in Finland. He received his Ph.D. from the University of Minnesota in 1964, where he was advised by David T. Lykken. A founding member of the Behavior Genetics Association, he served as its president in 1999 and received its Dobzhansky Award in 2007. He is known for his research using twins to study human behavioral traits such as alcoholism and IQ. This included working as a consultant on the Minnesota Study of Twins Reared Apart in the 1970s. He began collaborating with scientists at the University of Helsinki in 1984, and received an honorary doctorate from this university in 2009.

== Selected works ==
- Rose, Richard J.; Harris, E. L.; Christian, Joe C.; Nance, Walter E. (1979). "Genetic variance in nonverbal intelligence: data from the kinships of identical twins". Science. 205 (4411): 1153–1155. doi:10.1126/science.572991.
- Rose, Richard J.; Koskenvuo, Markku; Kaprio, Jaakko; Sarna, Seppo; et al. (1988). "Shared genes, shared experiences, and similarity of personality: data from 14,288 adult Finnish co-twins". Journal of Personality and Social Psychology. 54 (1): 161–171. doi:10.1037/0022-3514.54.1.161.
- Rose, Richard J. (1995). "Genes and human behavior". Annual Review of Psychology. 46: 625–654. doi:10.1146/annurev.ps.46.020195.003205.
- Rose, Richard J.; Dick, Danielle M.; Viken, Richard J.; Kaprio, Jaakko (2001). "Gene-environment interaction in patterns of adolescent drinking: regional residency moderates longitudinal influences on alcohol use". Alcoholism: Clinical and Experimental Research. 25 (5): 637–643. doi:10.1111/j.1530-0277.2001.tb02261.x.
- Dick, Danielle M.; Rose, Richard J. (2002). "Behavior genetics: what's new? What's next?". Current Directions in Psychological Science. 11 (2): 70–74. doi:10.1111/1467-8721.00171.
- Pulkkinen, Lea; Kaprio, Jaakko; Rose, Richard J., eds. (2006). Socioemotional Development and Health from Adolescence to Adulthood. Cambridge University Press. ISBN 978-0-521-84631-8.
- Rose, Richard J.; Salvatore, Jessica E.; Aaltonen, Sari; Barr, Peter B.; et al. (2019). "FinnTwin12 cohort: an updated review". Twin Research and Human Genetics. 22 (5): 302–311. doi:10.1017/thg.2019.83.
