= Thomas Kirke Rose =

Sir Thomas Kirke Rose (1865–1953) was a British chemist and metallurgist.

He was Assayer of the Royal Mint from 1902 until his retirement in 1926, and served on the Council of the Institution of Mining and Metallurgy every year from 1899 to 1926 except 1913, presiding from 1915 to 1916.

== Publications ==
His published works include The Metallurgy of Gold (1894) and The Precious Metals (1909). He was a contributor to the eleventh and fourteenth editions of the Encyclopaedia Britannica, and to the 1912 supplement to the Dictionary of National Biography.

== Awards ==
Rose was knighted in 1914.

In 1920 he was awarded the Gold Medal of the Institution of Mining and Metallurgy.
