= Roger Rose =

American actor

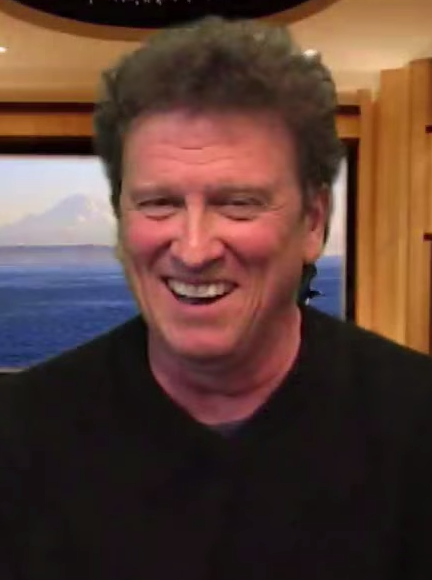
- Rose in 2018
- Occupations: Actor; VJ
- Years active: 1979–present
- Agent: Atlas Talent Agency
- Notable work: The Super Hero Squad Show; as Doctor Strange; Batman: The Brave and the Bold; as Superman
- Children: 2
- Father: Hilly Rose
- Website: rogerrose.com

Roger Rose is an American actor, known for such films as Ski Patrol and for voice work in animated films and television series such as Happy Feet, Rugrats, Scooby-Doo, The Grim Adventures of Billy & Mandy and Quack Pack. He is also an occasional announcer.

== Career ==
His first live role was in an episode of Buck Rogers in the 25th Century. He auditioned at Rod Roddy's podium in 2004 for the announcing job on television's longest-running game show, The Price Is Right, and was the announcer for the show's ceremonial 6,000th episode.

He starred in Ski Patrol (1990) and produced and acted in Comic Book: The Movie (2004). He voices on-air promos for most Major Television networks. He was the in-show Announcer for the Emmy Awards hosted by Jane Lynch on Fox. He voiced both the Dark Fiend Charles the 3rd and Aquatic Terror Gran Bruce in the video game Viewtiful Joe (2003). Some of his notable anime roles include several minor characters of Zatch Bell!. He also did the voice of Garbel of Manicuria on Bobobo-bo Bo-bobo. He also voiced promos for TV shows such as Ugly Betty and Hannah Montana "NCIS" "Big Bang". He has also done a David Letterman impression on several animated series, such as Tiny Toon Adventures and Animaniacs. In 2009, he voiced Doctor Strange on The Super Hero Squad Show, Superman on Batman: The Brave and the Bold, and an announcer in Danger Force. He has narrated documentaries for Animal Planet, (Discovery) and (National Geographic). Rose also announced the 2011 Emmy Awards.

He can be heard on WLS-TV in Chicago, (WLNY) in New York City, and KGO-TV in the San Francisco Bay Area.

== Personal life ==
He is the son of Hilly Rose, a radio personality in Los Angeles, and Sondra B. Gair, a radio interviewer with Chicago Public Radio. His brother was Judd Rose, of ABC.

== Filmography ==
=== Film ===
Year	Title	Role	Notes
1983	The Man Who Loved Women	Sergeant Stone	
1984	Hot Moves	Cliff	
1984	Micki + Maude	Newscaster	
1986	Friday the 13th Part VI: Jason Lives	Steven	
1990	Ski Patrol	Jerry Cramer	
1991	The Five Heartbeats	The Five Horsemen	
1992	Double Vision	Salesman	
1993	Love Bites	Dwight Putnam	
1994	Dead On	Russ Russell	
2000	Rugrats in Paris	Finster Wedding DJ	Voice
2000	The Brainiacs.com	Smartball	Voice
2003	Brother Bear	Additional Voices	Voice
2004	Comic Book: The Movie	Taylor Donohue	
2006	Naruto the Movie: Guardians of the Crescent Moon Kingdom	Additional Voices	
2006	Happy Feet	Leopard Seal	Voice
2007	Jekyll	Guy #2	
2010	The Cost of Heaven	Administrator	
2010	Lego: The Adventures of Clutch Powers	Brick Masterson	Voice
2014	Justice League: War	Pinstriped Loudmouth	Voice, direct-to-video
2019	Scooby-Doo! Return to Zombie Island	Lead Cat Person, Trailer Narrator	Voice, direct-to-video
2021	Free Birds	Ice Dragon	Voice

=== Television ===
Year	Title	Role	Notes
1981	Buck Rogers in the 25th Century	Marcos	Episode: "The Golden Man"
1981	Too Close for Comfort	Magician	Episode: "Guess Who's Coming to Burp?"
1983	Alice	Customer #2	Episode: "Vera's Secret Lover"
1984	Airwolf	Delivery Boy	Episode: "Random Target"
1985	Down to Earth	Herbie Schroeder	Episode: "The Radio Show"
1985	Knight Rider	Valet	Episode: "Knight by a Nose"
1985	Mr. Belvedere	Police Officer	Episode: "What I Did for Love"
1985	The Jetsons		Episode: "Elroy in Wonderland"
1986	Wildfire	Halavex	Voice, episode: "The Highwayman"
1986	Pound Puppies	Byron P. Fleabottom, Clawfinger, Spy 1	Voice
1990	Gravedale High	Vinnie Stoker	Voice
1990–1992	Tiny Toon Adventures		
1991	Lucy & Desi: Before the Laughter	Cousin Larry	
1991	Where's Wally?	Additional Voices	
1991–1995	Silk Stalkings	Dwight Guernsey; Eddie	
1992–1993	Batman: The Animated Series	Gilbert, Jaguar Shaman	Voice, 2 episodes
1993	Tom and Jerry Kids Show	Additional Voices	
1993	I Yabba-Dabba Do!	Additional Voices	
1993	Seinfeld	Mark	Episode: "The Pilot"
1993	Bonkers		
1993	2 Stupid Dogs	Quark	Voice, 2 episodes
1994	All-New Dennis the Menace	Additional Voices	
1994	Where on Earth Is Carmen Sandiego?	Additional Voices	
1994	The Super Dave Superbowl of Knowledge	Additional Voices	
1994	Taz-Mania	Arnie	Voice, episode: "The Return of the Road to Taz-Mania Strikes Back"
1994	Gargoyles	Cop 2, Doyle Spokesman	Voice, episode: "Ransom"
1994–1996	The Tick	Four-Legged Man, Brian Pinhead, additional voices	
1995	The Twisted Tales of Felix the Cat	Additional Voices	
1995–1997	Pinky and the Brain	David Letterman, Man #1, additional voices	Voice, 3 episodes
1995–1997	What a Cartoon!	Gorilla, Reilly	Voice, 3 episodes
1996–1997	Duckman	Carbone	Voice, 2 episodes
1996	The Real Adventures of Jonny Quest	Vince Vance	Voice, episode: "Manhattan Maneater"
1996	Superman: The Animated Series	Driver Cop	Voice, episode: "The Last Son of Krypton" Pt. 1
1996	Quack Pack	Kent Powers	Voice
1997	The Weird Al Show	Talk Show Host	Episode: "Talent Show"
1997–2004	Johnny Bravo	Various voices	
1998	Animaniacs	David Letterman	Voice, episode: "Hooray for North Hollywood"
1998	The Sylvester & Tweety Mysteries	Butler	Voice, episode: "A Fist Full of Lutefisk"
1998	Cow and Chicken	Cashier, Salesmen	Voice, episode: "Free Inside!"
1998–1999	Oh Yeah! Cartoons	Worker, Guard, Humpty Dumpty	Voice, 2 episodes
1999	The Brothers Flub	Additional Voices	
2000	Buzz Lightyear of Star Command	Additional Voices	2 episodes
2001	The Zeta Project	Ad-Bot	Voice, episode: "Hicksburg"
2001, 2003	The Powerpuff Girls	Additional voices	2 episodes
2001–2007	Growing Up...	Narrator	
2002	What's New, Scooby-Doo?	Additional Voices	
2002	Ozzy & Drix	Jumbo	Voice, episode: "The Globfather"
2002	My Life as a Teenage Robot	Julian, Charmer, Man	Voice, episode: "Shell Game"
2003–2007	The Grim Adventures of Billy & Mandy	Various voices	
2004	Justice League Unlimited	Lasser	Voice, episode: "Fearful Symmetry"
2005	Zatch Bell!	Hige, Rembrant, Zoboron, Fein, additional voices	Recurring role
2005–2006	Codename: Kids Next Door	Father, Little Juan	2 episodes
2007	The Batman	Chris	Voice, episode: "The Joining"
2008	Avatar: The Last Airbender	Bully Guard	Voice, episode: "The Boiling Rock"
2009–2011	The Super Hero Squad Show	Doctor Strange, Goodman	Voice, 7 episodes
2010	Batman: The Brave and the Bold	Superman	Voice, 2 episodes
2011	Regular Show	Infomercial Voice	Voice, episode: "Peeps"
2013–2015	Monsters and Mysteries in America	Narrator	
2015	Turbo Fast	Announcer, Bulgarian Snail	Voice, episode: "Tough as Snails"
2016	Avengers Assemble	Tad McDodd	Voice, episode: "Ant-Man Makes It Big"
2022	Danger Force	Announcer	Episode: "The Supies"
2026	Rooster Fighter	Morio	Voice: English dub

=== Video games ===
Year	Title	Role	Notes
1996	Blazing Dragons	Sir Juicealot, Police Officer	
1997	Zork: Grand Inquisitor	Marvin the Mythical Goatfish	
1997	Goosebumps: Attack of the Mutant	Pinky Flamingo	
2001	Metal Gear Solid 2: Sons of Liberty	Russian Soldier	English version
2002	Dead to Rights	Augie Blatz, Tattoo, Fat Chow	
2002	Metal Gear Solid 2: Substance	Russian Soldier	
2003	Viewtiful Joe	Charles the 3rd, Gran Bruce	
2004	Viewtiful Joe 2	Flinty Stone	
2005	Shadow of Rome	Sextus	
2005	Viewtiful Joe: Red Hot Rumble	Charles III, Gran Bruce, Flinty Stone	
2006	Gothic 3	Additional voices	
2006	Metal Gear Acid 2	Golab	
2006	Marvel: Ultimate Alliance	Vision, Captain Marvel	
2006	Downhill Jam	Antonio Segul	
2006	Happy Feet	Leopard Seal	
2007	Shrek the Third	Peasant, Bandit, Pirate	
2009	X-Men Origins: Wolverine	Additional Voices	
2009	Assassin's Creed II	Thieves	
2009	Batman: Arkham Asylum	William North, Masked Guard	
2010	Assassin's Creed: Brotherhood	Thieves	
2011	Rage	Additional voices	
2011	PlayStation Move Heroes	Buccaneer	
2011	Batman: Arkham City	M.P.T. Officer William North, GCPD Officer Strictland	
2013	Marvel Heroes	Mole Man	
2014	Metal Gear Solid V: Ground Zeroes	Soldiers, Agent Brian	
2015	Metal Gear Solid V: The Phantom Pain	Soldiers	
2016	Fire Emblem Fates	Takumi, Niles, Hisame	
2018	Red Dead Redemption 2	The Local Pedestrian Population	
2018	World of Final Fantasy Maxima	The Immortal Dark Dragon	
2023	Honkai: Star Rail	Sampo	
2026	Mega Man Star Force Legacy Collection	Acid	

=== Theme parks ===
Year	Title	Role	Notes
2005	Robots of Mars 3D Adventure	Sparky, Blasto, Lurker, Gor	
