= Peter Rose (opera singer) =

English operatic bass

Peter Rose is an English operatic bass.

== Early life and education ==
Rose was born in Canterbury. He read music at the University of East Anglia and studied with Ellis Keeler at the Guildhall School of Music and Drama. In 1985 he won the Kathleen Ferrier Memorial Scholarship and in 1986 the Glyndebourne John Christie Award. He made his operatic debut in 1986 with Glyndebourne Festival Opera in Hong Kong as Commendatore in Mozart's opera Don Giovanni.

== Career ==
Rose has appeared on opera houses such as the Wiener Staatsoper, Metropolitan Opera, Teatro alla Scala, Royal Opera House Covent Garden, Staatsoper Berlin, Deutsche Oper Berlin, Bayerische Staatsoper, Bayreuth Festspielhaus, Glyndebourne Festival Opera, and the Opéra de Paris.

He is best known for his role as Baron Ochs in Richard Strauss' opera Der Rosenkavalier.

In 2020, he was appointed Kammersänger at the Wiener Staatsoper.
