= Institut für Mikrosystemtechnik =

Coordinates: 48.01362°N 7.83552°E

Institut für Mikrosystemtechnik (IMTEK; "Department of Microsystems Engineering") at the University of Freiburg is Germany's largest research institute dedicated to all aspects of MEMS and Microsystems Engineering. It currently has more than 650 graduate students and 23 research groups. The department is active in both fundamental and applied research.

== Research groups ==
IMTEK consists of the following research groups, each led by a tenured professor:

- MEMS Applications
- Assembly and Packaging
- Biomedical Microtechnology
- Bio Microtechnics
- Bio- and Nano-Photonics
- Chemistry and Physics of Interfaces
- Electrical Instrumentation
- Design of Microsystems
- Microsystem Materials
- Micro-actuators
- Microelectronics
- Micro-optics
- Nanotechnology
- Process Technology
- Sensors
- Simulation
- Systems Theory
- Compound Semiconductor Microsystems
- Materials Process Technology

In addition, IMTEK has established interdisciplinary graduate colleges for the following themes:

- Embedded Microsystems
- Micro Energy Harvesting

== Cleanroom ==
IMTEK houses a 600 sqm advanced cleanroom that is used for training and research. IMTEK is also a hub of regional and national collaborative research between academia and industry.
