= International Forum of Public Universities =

The International Forum of Public Universities (IFPU) [French: Forum international des universités publiques (FIUP)] is a consortium of 23 public universities.

== History ==
In 2004, discussions among foreign university chiefs who had been invited to receive honorary degrees at the Université de Montréal's quasquicentennial led to a subsequent conference in Belgium and a decision to establish a formal association. Bringing together a limited number of universities from diverse countries, the forum was founded on October 11, 2007, at the Université de Montréal with the mission of "promoting the expression of values that underlie the mission of public universities in an era of internationalization". In 2008, the consortium included 13 of the world's 200 top universities according to Times Higher Education rankings. Each year, a specialized summer school is hosted by one of its member universities.

== Aims ==
Enhancing mutual understanding, integrating possible resources for supporting teachers, and facilitating the application of joint research projects in accordance with international influential events or organizations.

== Meetings ==
Meetings have been attended by World Bank experts in tertiary education.

- October 11, 2007 at Université de Montréal
- November 8–9, 2008 at Peking University, linked with the Beijing forum
- “Technological Innovation, Social Transformation and Competitiveness of Public Universities,” 7th annual meeting at Nankai University, Tianjin, October 28, 2013
- 10th Summer Doctoral School at Nankai University, Tianjin, June 10–15, 2018

== Member universities ==
- Universidad de Buenos Aires (Argentina)
- Université libre de Bruxelles (Belgium)
- Universidade de São Paulo (Brazil)
- Université de Montréal (Canada)
- Universidad de Chile (Chile)
- Nankai University (China)
- Peking University (China)
- Charles University (Czech Republic)
- University of Paris III: Sorbonne Nouvelle (France)
- University of Freiburg (Germany)
- Jawaharlal Nehru University (India)
- Università di Bologna (Italy)
- Nagoya University (Japan)
- Universidad Nacional Autónoma de México (Mexico)
- Mohammed V University at Agdal (Morocco)
- Universitatea din București (Romania)
- Lomonosov Moscow State University (Russia)
- Université Cheikh Anta Diop (Senegal)
- Universitat de Barcelona (Spain)
- Université de Genève (Switzerland)
- University of California (United States)

== Associated members ==
- University of Ouagadougou (Burkina Faso)
- Université d'État d'Haïti (Haiti)
