= University Library Freiburg =

Academic and research library in Freiburg, Germany

Coordinates: 47°59′38″N 7°50′43″E

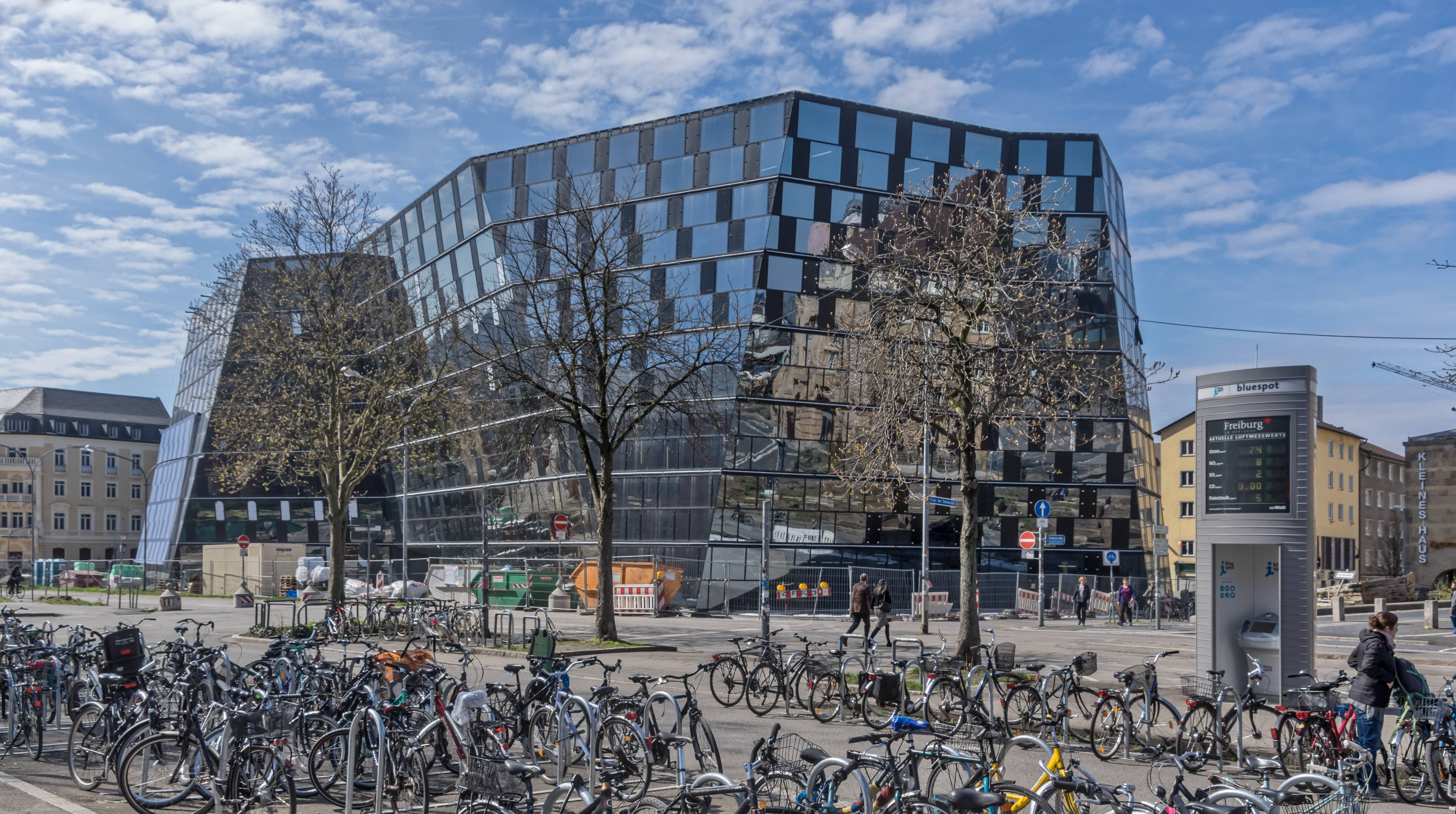
The University Library

The University Library Freiburg (German: Universitätsbibliothek Freiburg, UB) is the library of the University of Freiburg. As an academic and research library, it caters to students and staff of the University of Freiburg, the University of Education Freiburg, the Catholic University of Applied Sciences Freiburg, and the Protestant University of Applied Sciences Freiburg. The library is open to interested members of the public as well.

== History ==
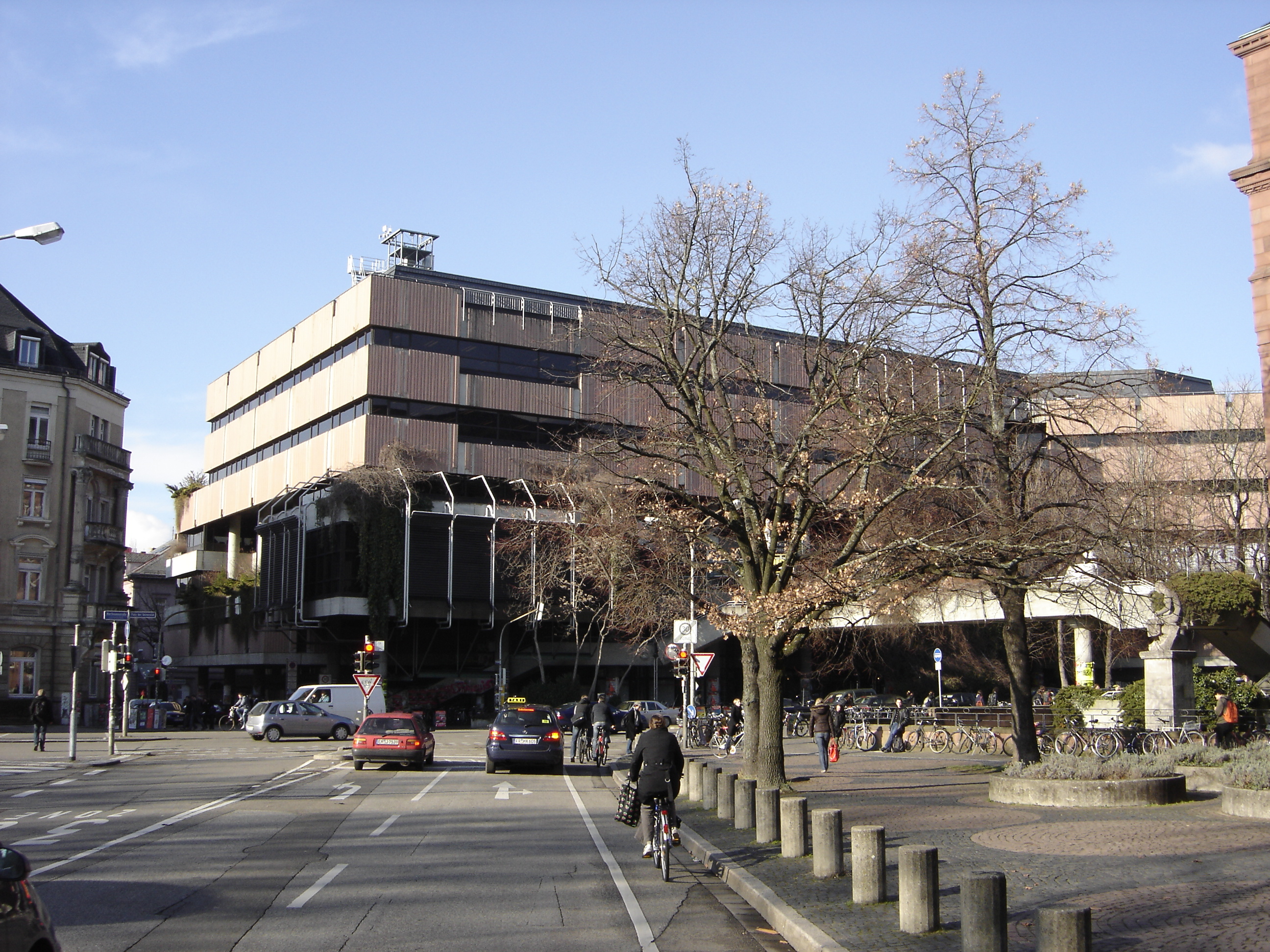
Main library building prior to undergoing extensive renovation from 2008 to 2015

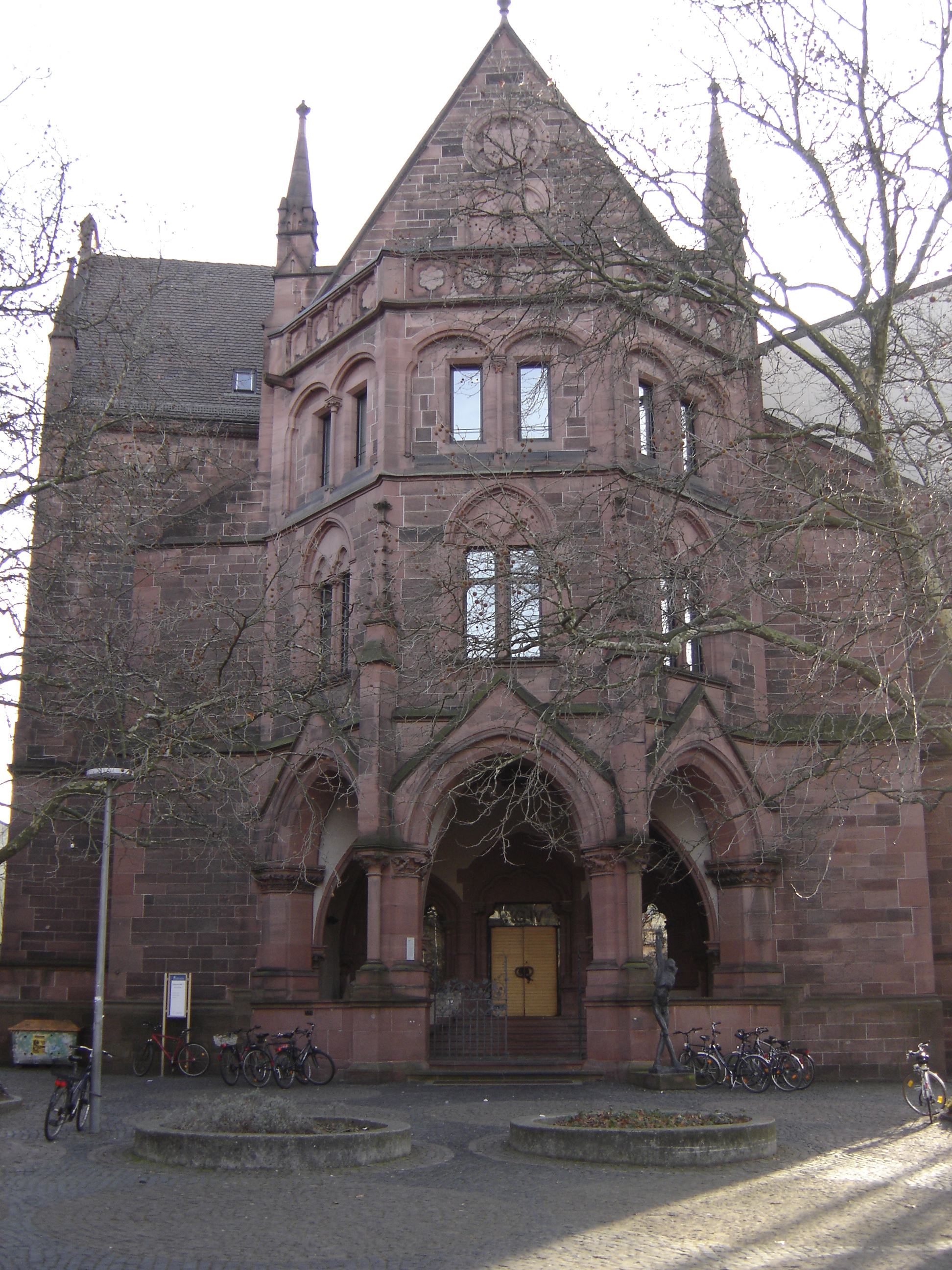
Kollegiengebäude IV housed the University Library from 1903 to 1978

When the University of Freiburg was founded in 1457 the libraries were most commonly attached to the respective faculties. The term "biblioteca universitatis" was used for the first time in 1505 in protocols of the university's Academic Senate probably for the faculty of arts library. Besides the faculty's book-collection, its different Burses (medieval predecessors of student halls) and so called "Stiftungshäuser" (student housing maintained by endowments) were of great importance for the students (Domus Cartusiana, 1485; Collegium Sapientiae Collegium Sapientiae Freiburg 1496 and in the 16th century Collegium Battmanicum, Collegium S.Galli and Collegium Pacis). Endowments were important to the library's accretion as well, particularly in its early years. Maria Theresia's Maria Theresa reforms constitute the background of the above-mentioned arrangements and increasingly influenced the library's acquisition policies as well. In 1755, the various libraries were finally joined to form a common library and a new hall was constructed to house the inventory of books. A full-time librarian worked there from 1768. The abolition of the Catholic order Society of Jesus in 1773 marked the end of the Jesuit presence at the university. The Jesuit order had been in charge of large parts of the university since 1620. Due to the suppression of the order, large collections of books from Jesuit libraries were transferred to University of Freiburg, leading to a rapid expansion of the University Library's stock. In 1791 the grammar school moved to the Brunnenstraße and would later become the "Berthold grammar school". The library remained at its location. The secularization and reforms introduced by Emperor Joseph II of Austria subsequently caused the disbandment of several monasteries, further contributing to the increase in books.

The creation of a commission dedicated to acquiring literature in 1795 as well as the professionalization of the library direction led to a continuing prosperous growth of the library and its inventory. After the library had moved into a gothic revival building in 1903, numerous reforms to the organization were enacted. The executives Emil Jacobs (1912–1929) and Josef Rest (1929–1953) undertook several reforms concerning the library's organisational system: in 1924 an interlibrary loan system service (ILL) of southern German libraries, a system for acquiring specialist literature, indexing and a consulting service were set up. In 1932, a collection of natural scientific and medical textbooks were acquired, further the so-called "Preußische Instruktionen" (a system of rules for libraries) helped to bring forward the alphabetical categorisation and participation on establishing the German general catalogue from 1931 until its destruction during the second world war World War II. Various publications and exhibitions showed a new emphasis on public presence. On top, use of the library was further improved by funding exhibitions and publications, thus PR. During Nazi Germany, the University Library like the University of Freiburg itself complied with the racist laws and censorship of the regime. Due to the timely evacuation of many of books, the library was able to prevent the destruction of large quantities of its inventory during World War II, despite significant damage to the library building. The post-war years are characterized by reconstruction and the reorganization as well as expansion of the library's stock.

A new building was constructed in 1978 to house the library and its inventory, which by now had grown to become very extensive. New catalogs were introduced and a university library system including faculty libraries was implemented. In recent years, the expansion of digital volumes and new media has been a focus of the development of the University Library Freiburg. The podcasting service offered by the library was selected as a landmark in the initiative Germany – Land of Ideas sponsored by the German government and the Federation of German Industries.

The first hall serving as location for the University Library mentioned above was expanded in 1822 to ensure its continuous use. In 1903, the library moved to a gothic revival building, which is today known as the Kollegiengebäude IV (KG IV). In 1978, the University of Freiburg constructed a new building across from the Kollegiengebäude II and next to the Freiburg Theater.

== Building ==
=== Rempartstraße ===
A new building was approved by authorities on 22 February in 1897, which was designed by the architect Carl Schäfer, originally from Karlsruhe, in a neo-Gothic style and which was to be located in the Rempartstraße. The property had not the form of a square but rather the one of a triangle. Thus, the building was planned beginning at the peak of the property. The Landtag granted a budget of 576,000 German marks for this project. The construction management was led by architect Kiels.
The west side, including the portal, was 12 and 25 meters long. The attached north and south wings, each being 50 meters, were connected to the 49 meter long round arch in the east. The cornice was 16 meters above street level. The stacks building, where the books were stored, was separated into five floors, whereas the rest of the building consisted of only three floors. Inside, there was a 420 sqm atrium with an entrance in the south side. From there, you could see the inflow of the stream that, by driving the 23 hp underground turbine unit, powered the lighting of the building.

In late 1896, they started demolishing a dwelling and a mill called 'Paradiesmühle,' which were both located on the property. Excavation work began in March 1897 and masonry work on 12 June. In mid-June 1898, the plinth height was reached. The foundation plates were partially as far as 8.5 meters below street level. Bigger parts of blown up castles' walls and a lot of other debris were found on the terrain. A wet ditch, stretching from south to north, was causing the extraordinary depth of the foundation. Overall, 1440 sqm were built over. In 1903, the library moved into the new building. During the Second World War, the building's south wing was destroyed. In the 1950s, a more modern wing with a different floor height for the administration was added. A new reading room was built in the former courtyard. After the library moved to a new building in the 'Werderring' in the 1980s, the building was converted into a collegiate building ('Kollegiengebäude IV') with a networked library, including six institute and seminary libraries in the reading room and adjoining rooms. There is a bronze sculpture of the Marsyas by Alfred Hrdlicka from 1985 in front of the entrance.

=== Current building ===
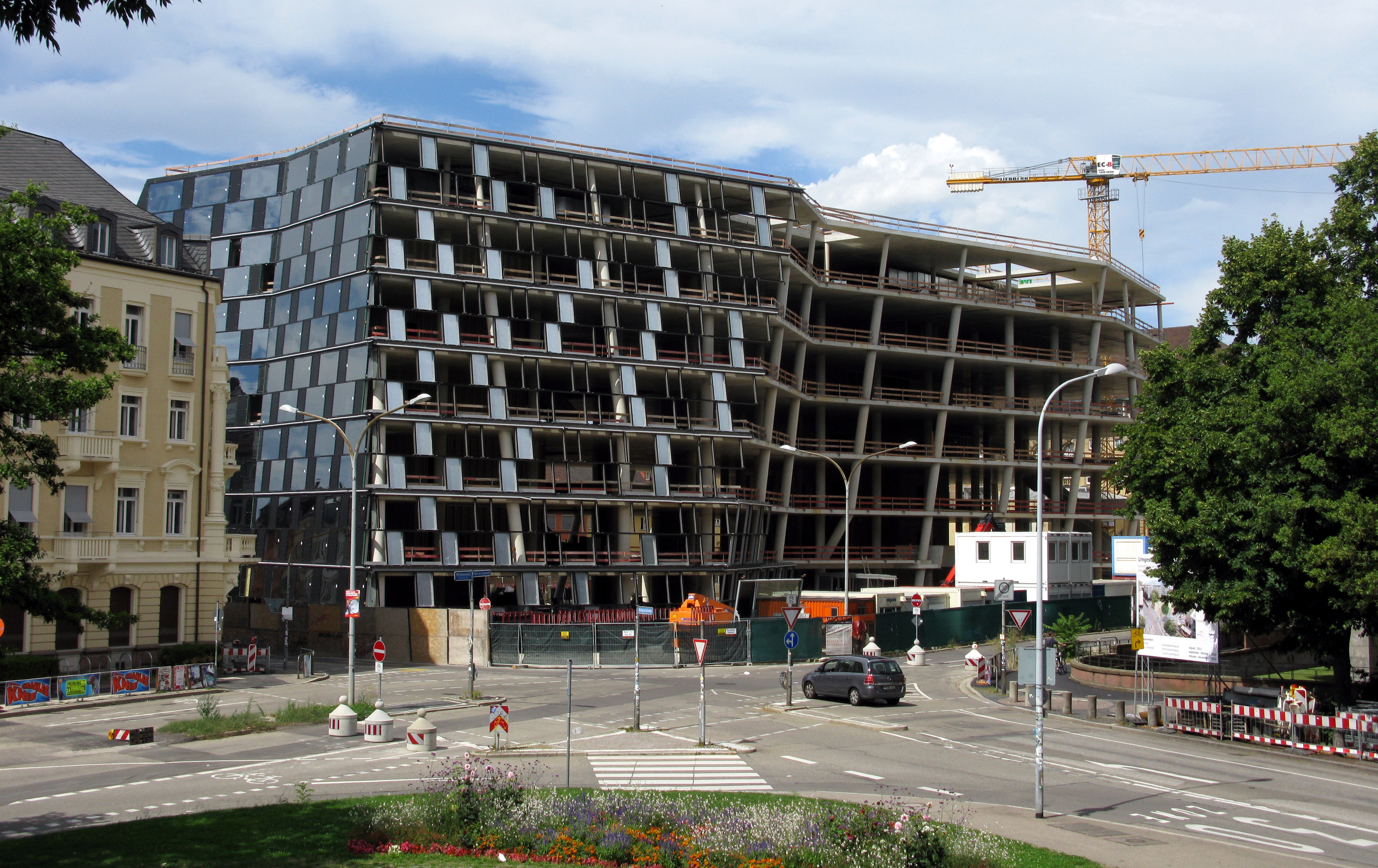
The University Library before the installation of the facade

The library had to be renovated primarily because the technology that was used in the building, e.g. the air conditioning system, was outdated, and because the front was damaged. The reconstruction of the library was intended to save money in the management of the building. The library is also supposed to integrate into the city's urban development concept. In early 2006, the reconstruction was initiated by an architectural design competition. The winner was Degelo Architekten, an architecture firm from Basel. Initially, the costs were estimated at 32 million Euros. The newly constructed building holds 1,200 workspaces in four reading rooms as well as 500 work areas in the parlatory. At the same time it is supposed to save 60 to 70% of the energy costs of the former building, about 700,000 Euros per year.

Between fall 2008 and July 2015, the University Library was moved to two temporary quarters: the UB 1 (University Library 1) was in the former civic hall and the UB 2 (University Library 2) was located on the street Rempartstraße. Due to the temporary move of the library, the UB 1 (in the former city hall) initiated 24/7 opening hours. This was maintained in the new building. In September 2009, the pedestrian bridge, which was situated next to the old library, was torn down. In the following months, the building was freed from harmful substances, electronics and carpets.

Starting in January 2011, the old building was rebuilt. Different than originally planned, only three stairwells were not destroyed after the partial demolition of the aboveground part of the building. The extent of this demolition process was far bigger than previously planned. On the one hand, more contaminated material had to be disposed of. On the other hand, the previously planned addition to the existing ceilings would not have fulfilled the new earthquake norms. For that reason, the ceilings had to be renewed completely. The three basements with storage space for books were preserved. During the reconstruction the storage space was further used, and 3.5 million books were accessible further on. The tear down of the building was done in December 2011, after which the shell was built. In October 2012, while building the shell, it became public that the renovation would exceed the planned cost of 44 million euros. On 10 November 2012, a construction worker died on the site of the new university library because he fell from the scaffolding. The shell was completed in April 2013.

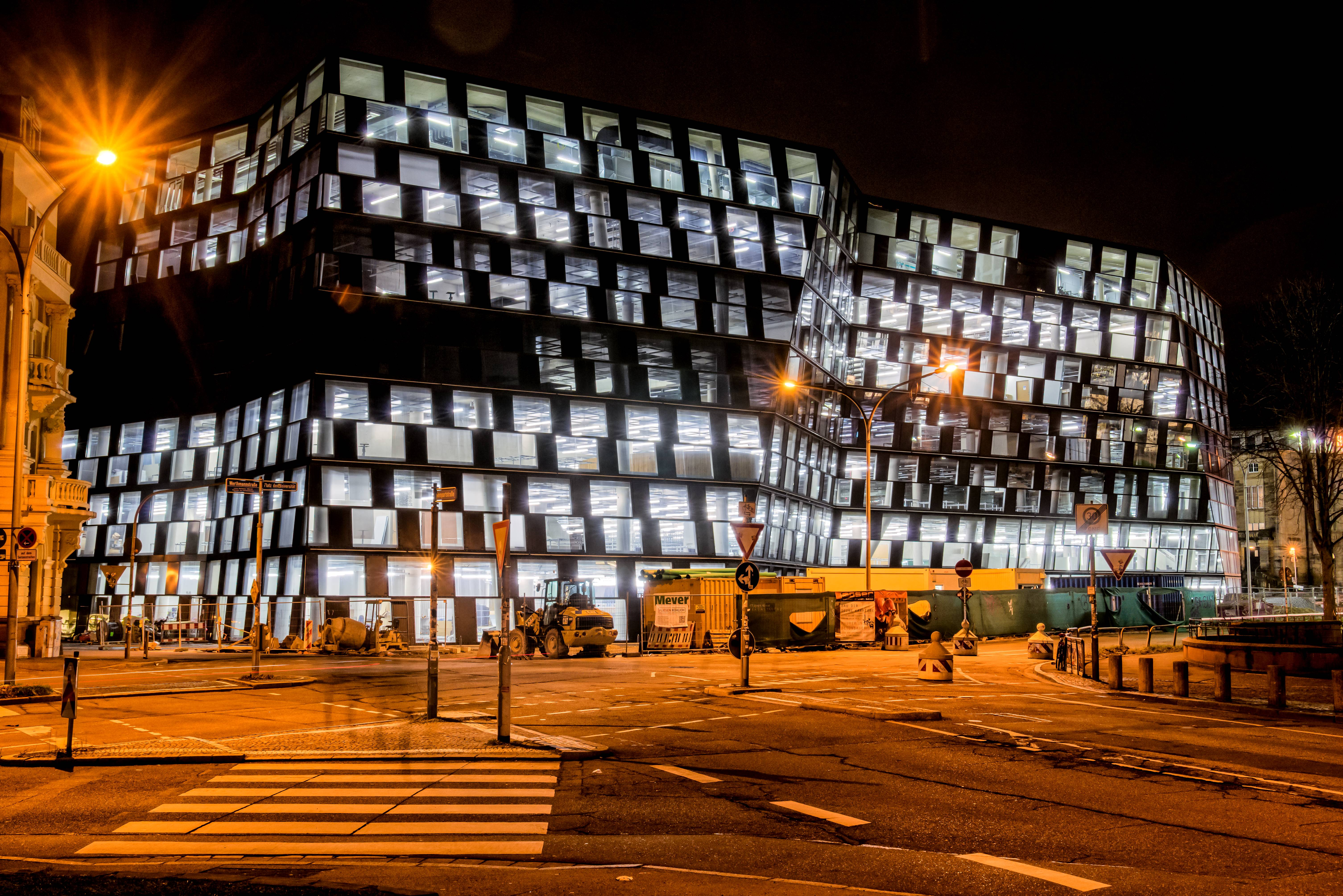
The University Library in February 2015

In the same month, interior construction began, as well as the installation of a 7,300 m^{2} facade of glass and matted, dark chrome steel. In April 2014, the front was completed. Its paneling was not finished until shortly before the opening in July. In addition to this mishap, the company which was supposed to be responsible for all of the building services went bankrupt. Further difficulties with the building include the fact that traffic participants are blinded by the reflections on the southeastern corner of the glass front when the sun is low in spring and fall. For this reason, canvas blinds are used to cover it during these times.

The new university library began test operation on 21 July 2015, almost two years after initially planned. During this phase the building services, book drop, WiFi, guidance systems and other procedures were being optimized. On 12 October 2015, the library was officially handed over to the university in the presence of two federal ministers. Construction in total then cost 53 million euros. Initially, the library was planned to open in the fall of 2013. Then, "mid- 2014" was announced as an opening date, which was shortly thereafter replaced by "late 2014".

The central concept behind the building's design was to have workspaces around the exterior of each floor with books stored in the center. After a successful test phase, 24/7 opening hours were maintained. The new building is 20% smaller in volume than the previous building; however, it offers a net floor area that is 30,600 m^{2} greater than the previous building and a total of 1,700 workspaces. The building is organized as follows:

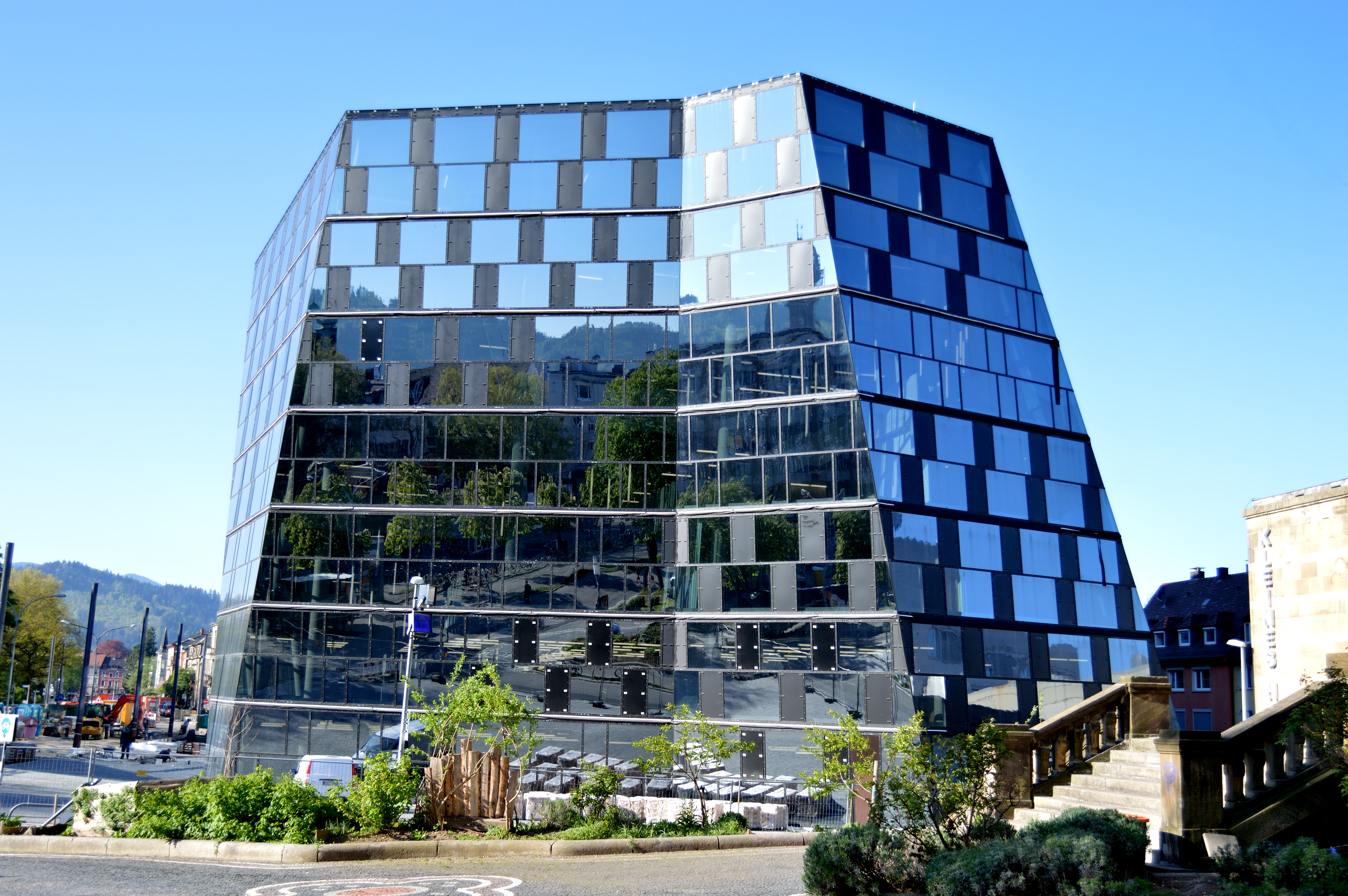
The current University Library in Freiburg

- On the ground floor, a book drop and information counter, as well as lockers, are located on the southern side (near Belfortstrasse) and on the northern side, you can find Cafe Libresso with a terrace extending to the Platz der Alten Synagoge.
- For every floor above the second floor, the floors are divided into two sections: On the southern side, there are reading rooms (numbered 1 to 4 in accordance with the floor number) where the permanent collection can be accessed. This side of the library is dedicated to quiet work. The northern side features a parlatory where group work is encouraged. This area features display screens and speaking is allowed. You can only pass from one side to the next via the ground floor, as the two sections on each floor above that one are divided by a glass wall.
- The southern side of the third floor is home to the law school, which used to be located in the university building KGII (Kollegiengebäude II). The reading room for these students is located on the fifth floor of the library.
- The north side of the building also features an auditorium for up to 200 people on the second floor, classrooms on the third floor, a media center on the fourth floor, and public access computers on the fifth floor.
- The sixth floor is home to the library administration department and the seventh floor houses the building services.
- The first basement floor features automated checkout machines and 700,000 volumes that can be borrowed, as well as a bicycle garage that can store up to 400 bikes.
- There are two floors beneath this first basement floor that serve the purpose of storage for the permanent collection. These books can be ordered and checked out as well.

At peak times, the library counts 12,000 visitors per day which makes the 1,700 workspaces insufficient. Since February 2016, so called "Pausenuhren", similar to parking discs, have been used to mark workspaces which are left by students for a break, which may not be longer than 60 minutes. Similar regulations are common in other university libraries as well. In 2018, students, especially those of the law faculty as they do not have a library on their own, still complained about a lack of space. Thus, in January, places in reading room two where marked with stickers to reserve them for lawyers-to-be. Books will be placed closer together and book shelfs will be removed to make more space available.

=== Construction defects ===
Immediately after closing the facade in spring 2014 they noticed that traffic participants were blinded by the reflection of the low settled sun at the south-east corner in spring or autumn. Therefore, this corner is covered with a sun sail during this period. This costs multiple maintenances. This discussion between the foreign office for wealth and building and the architect Heinrich Degelo is on court since 2019. In May 2016, they uncovered that the facade was leaking water into the building when its raining. Within the scope of warranty this issue is said to be fixed. As a result of overloading the groundlevel floor broke in July 2016. The floor of every level consists of five centimeter thick stone plates, which enclose a 30 to 35 centimeter high cavity, in which cables are placed and serves as a ventilation duct. This is also why the floor is also referred to as a pressurised floor. As a consequence electrical wheelchairs and bookwagons had to be carried on wooden plates laying above the normal floor. When repairing the floor in the beginning of 2017, a few stone plates were slightly lowered in order to install a felt cover that was supposed to reduce the noise. A not functioning aslant door was replaced with a straight one, against the architect's will. In the beginning of 2017 a water damage was wantonly brought about, leading to the palatorium being closed for a couple of days. On 6 August 2018, a loose metal sheet on the facade's cladding got released and fell down. Nobody was harmed. Ever since the surrounding of the UB is locked and some entrances were provisionally roofed.(dec.2018). The bureau of "assets and construction" Baden-Württemberg is convinced that this construction defect is a warranty case and that the company that built the façade had to reattach the whole façade. The metalworking company Früh from Umkirch claims that those defects are due to a damage. The company is also still arguing with "assets and construction" about the final bill, because 4.2 Million Euros have still not been paid. In March 2019, another metal sheet of the façade fell down and landed inside the provisional fence. In May 2019, the work on reattaching the metal sheets began.

In August 2018 it became known that, since the opening of the UB in 2015, the people working in the UB complained about bad air conditions in their offices, watery eyes and dried mucous membranes, which made doctors appointments necessary. The head of "assets and construction", Karl-Heinz Bühler, admitted that the air flow was not optimal in every part of the building, especially in smaller offices and in the basement. Bühler says that a solution for this problem has long been worked on and technical improvements will be made. Because of a report, a catalogue of measures was created in June 2019 and some of the measures have already been executed. In the meantime, the inadequate air flow was determined in the whole building.

In autumn 2020, many different lawsuits continue because of the defects on the façade and the metal sheets of the façade have still not been reattached. On the backside of the building, they have not even been removed because the reason for the leakage has not been found yet.

== Service and organization ==
In accordance to the State University Law of 2005, § 28, the library, together with its computer centre is the information centre for the university. It serves not only as a lending system but as archive- and reference library as well. In addition, the library team organizes the non-local inter-library loan, coordinates the supply of literature and information throughout the whole University Library system and offers necessary technological services for reproduction and microform scanning etc. The holdings of Freiburg's library system are already largely recorded in the online holding catalogue. The library team catalogues its collection in the Southwest German Library Network and takes on supra-regional tasks e. g. through the Regional Database Information (ReDI). The New Media Centre, the University Library, provides production- editing- and presentation options for analogue and digital audio-visual media. The University Library also supervises uni.tv. Historical audio documents and current lecture series are offered as podcast. The Learning Centre of the library offers the possibility of working with digital media or new information technologies with supervised learning methods. In 2019, the Carl Friedrich von Siemens Foundation supported the acquisition of printed books with 350,000 Euro (about 424,000 US Dollar).

== Volumes and media ==
With an inventory of approximately 3.6 million volumes, the University Library Freiburg is one of the largest libraries in the state of Baden-Württemberg. In 2007, the library saw over 2 million borrowings by around 36,000 active users. With its current holdings of more than 4.6 million media units (in print, audiovisual and electronic), it serves not only as an information centre for the university but for the whole region of Southern Baden as well. The electronic lending system (OLIX) was established in 1978. It records 1.2 million lendings a year by its 25,000 currently registered users. There are 30 PC workstations available for computer research.700,000 volumes are available for the lending. They are ordered according to the four major groups which are humanities, social sciences, medicines and natural sciences. Together with the "Freiburger documentation of researches" and the university's FreiDok, the UB comprises around 147,000 publications of Freiburg scientists. The inventory includes 64,000 newspaper articles, 4,000 scripts and autographs, around 3,500 incunabula, 42,000 prints of the 16th and 17th century, 45 literary legacies of professors and various papyruses (fragments that are prepared in 147 glass plates).

== Film location ==
The film-director Christian Ditter was inspired by a picture of the futuristic building to choose Freiburg as the film location for the Netflix series Biohackers, which was shot in 2020.
