= University of Freiburg =

Public university in Freiburg, Germany

Coordinates: 47°59′39″N 7°50′49″E

- Albert-Ludwigs-Universität Freiburg
- Latin: Alma Mater Alberto-Ludoviciana
- Motto: Die Wahrheit wird euch frei machen
- Motto in English: The truth will set you free
- Type: Public
- Established: 21 September 1457; 569 years ago
- Affiliations: U15; EUA; IFPU; EUCOR; LERU; EPICUR; GUEI
- Budget: EUR 340.1 million
- Rector: Kerstin Krieglstein
- Academic staff: 4,602
- Administrative staff: 2,136
- Students: 24,391
- Location: Freiburg im Breisgau, Baden-Württemberg, Germany
- Campus: University town
- Colors: Blue and White
- Website: uni-freiburg.de
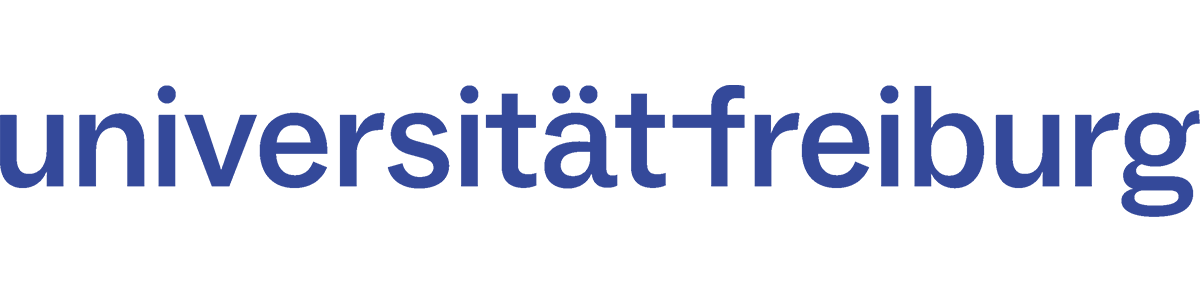

- Location within Germany Location within Baden-Württemberg

The University of Freiburg (colloquially German: Uni Freiburg), officially the Albert Ludwig University of Freiburg (German: Albert-Ludwigs-Universität Freiburg), is a public research university located in Freiburg im Breisgau, Baden-Württemberg, Germany. The university was founded in 1457 by the Habsburg dynasty as the second university in Austrian-Habsburg territory after the University of Vienna. Today, Freiburg is the fifth-oldest university in Germany, with a long tradition of teaching the humanities, social sciences and natural sciences and technology and enjoys a high academic reputation both nationally and internationally. The university is made up of 11 faculties and attracts students from across Germany as well as from over 120 other countries. Foreign students constitute about 18.2% of total student numbers.

The University of Freiburg has been associated with figures such as Hannah Arendt, Rudolf Carnap, David Daube, Johann Eck, Hans-Georg Gadamer, Friedrich Hayek, Martin Heidegger, Edmund Husserl, Herbert Marcuse, Friedrich Meinecke, Edith Stein, Paul Uhlenhuth, Max Weber and Ernst Zermelo. As of October 2020, 22 Nobel laureates are affiliated with the University of Freiburg as alumni, faculty or researchers, and 15 academics have been honored with the highest German research prize, the Gottfried Wilhelm Leibniz Prize, while working at the university.

== History ==
=== Foundation ===
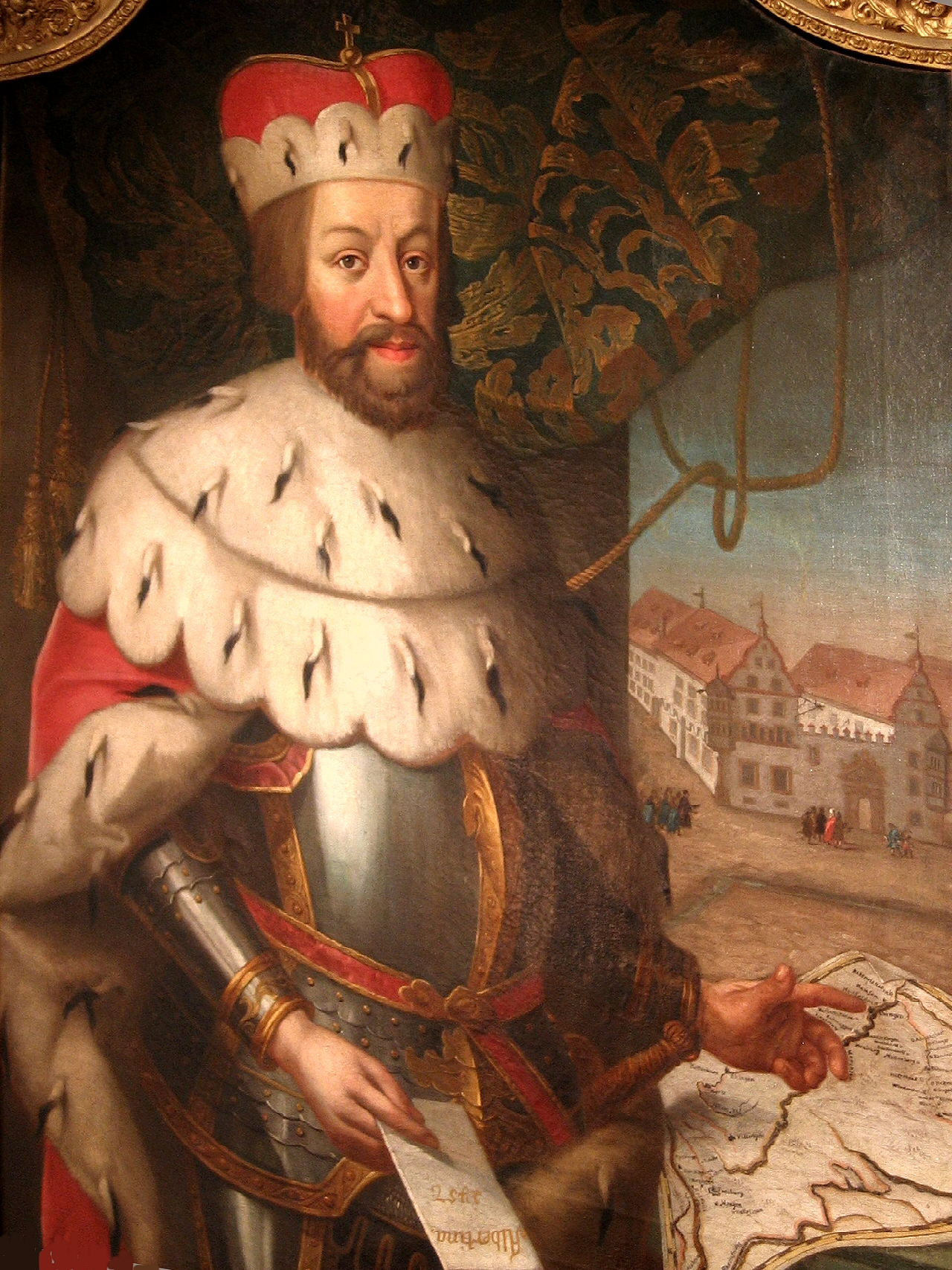
Portrait of Archduke Albert VI of Austria, founder of the university

Originally Albrechts University, the university started with four faculties (theology, philosophy, medicine, and law). Its establishment belongs to the second wave of university foundings in the German-speaking world in the late Middle Ages, like the University of Tübingen and the University of Basel (Switzerland). Established by papal privilege (papal bull), the university in Freiburg actually was – like all or most universities in the Middle Ages – a corporation of the church body and therefore belonged to the Roman Catholic Church and its hierarchy. The bishop of Basel consequently was its provost or chancellor (Kanzler), the bishop of Constance was its patron, and the real founder of the university was the sovereign, Archduke Albert VI of Austria, being the brother of Frederick III, Emperor of the Holy Roman Empire of the German Nation. At its founding, the university was named after Albert VI of Austria. He provided the university with land and endowments, as well as its own jurisdiction. Also he declared Albrechts University as the "county university" (German Landesuniversität) for his territory until it was handed over to the Austrian House of Habsburg in 1490.

The university soon attracted many students, such as the humanists Geiler von Kaysersberg, Johann Reuchlin, and Jakob Wimpfeling. When Ulrich Zasius was teaching law (until 1536), Freiburg became a centre of humanist jurisprudence. From 1529 to 1535, Erasmus of Rotterdam after having left Basel, lived and taught in Freiburg, however, never at the university. From around 1559 on, the university was housed at the Altes Collegium ("Old College"), today called the "new town-hall". The importance of the university decreased during the time of the Counter-Reformation. To counter reformatory tendencies, the administration of two faculties was handed over to the Roman Catholic order of the Jesuits in 1620. From 1682 on, the Jesuits built their college, as well as the Jesuit church (nowadays the "University Church" or Universitätskirche).

=== Studium Gallicum ===
In 1679, Freiburg temporarily became French territory, along with the southern parts of the upper Rhine. French King Louis XIV disliked the Austrian system and gave the Jesuits a free hand to operate the university. On 6 November 1684, a bilingual educational program was initiated. From 1686 to 1698, the faculty fled to Konstanz.

=== Austrian reforms ===
After Freiburg was re-conquered and appointed as capital of Further Austria, a new time began for the university by the reforms of Empress Maria Theresa of Austria. The requirements for admission were changed for all faculties in 1767 (before that time only Roman Catholics were allowed to study) and Natural Sciences were added as well as Public Administration. Also in 1767, the university became a governmental institution despite the Church's protests. The Church finally lost its predominant influence on the university when the Jesuits were suppressed following a decree signed by Pope Clement XIV in 1773. Consequently, Johann Georg Jacobi (brother of the more famous philosopher Friedrich Heinrich Jacobi) in 1784 was the first Protestant professor teaching at the university in Freiburg.

When Freiburg became a part of the newly established Grand Duchy of Baden in 1805 (after Napoleon occupied the area of the formerly Further Austria), a crisis began for the university in Freiburg. Indeed, there were considerations by Karl Friedrich, Grand Duke of Baden and Karl, Grand Duke of Baden to close down the university in Freiburg while both of them thought that the Grand Duchy could not afford to run two universities at the same time (the Ruprecht Karl University of Heidelberg had existed since 1386).

=== University of Freiburg ===
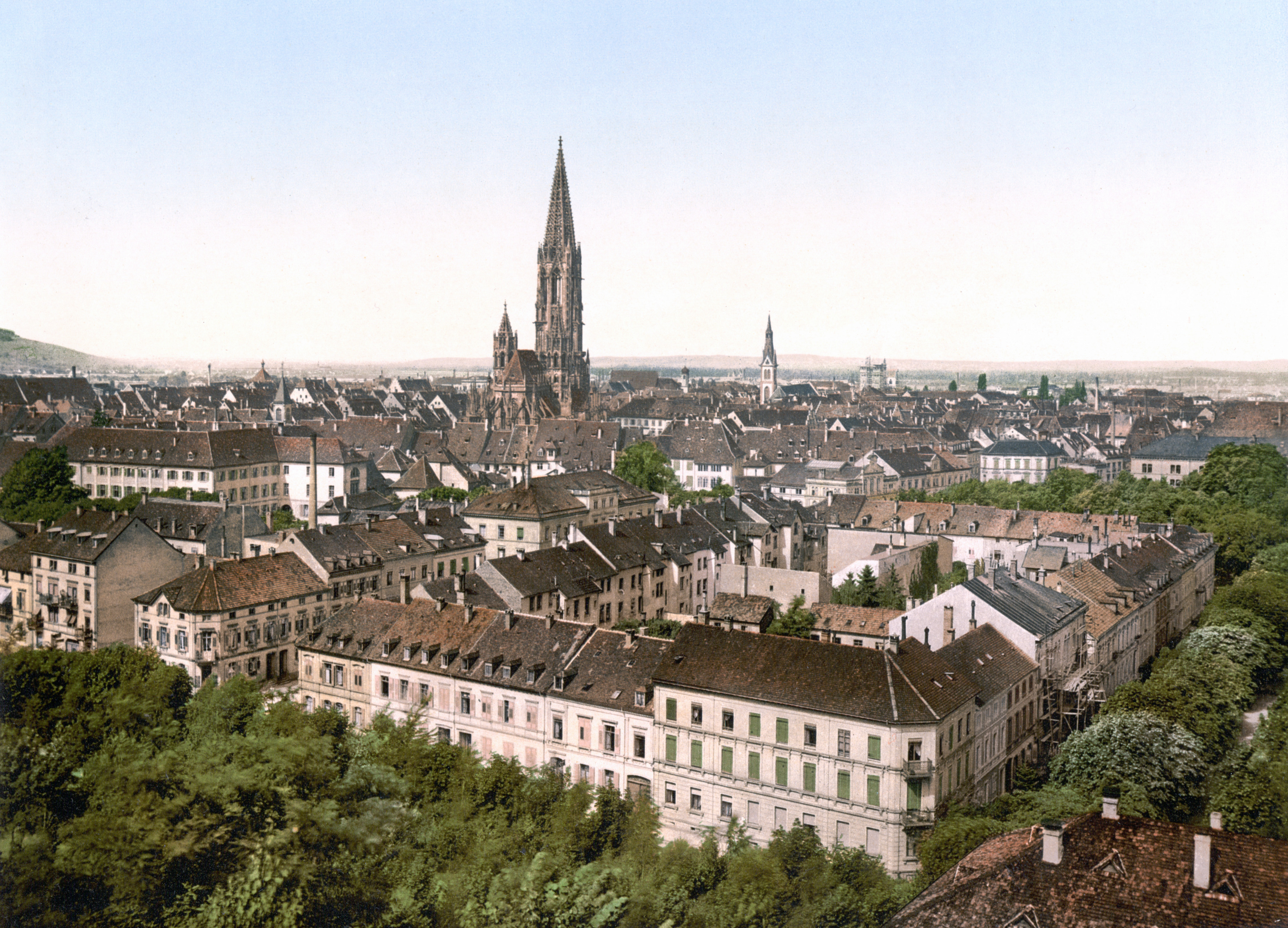
Freiburg around 1900

The university had enough endowments and earnings to survive until the beginning of the regency of Ludwig I, Grand Duke of Baden in 1818. Finally in 1820, he saved the university with an annual contribution. Since then, the university has been named Albert Ludwigs University of Freiburg (Albert-Ludwigs-Universität Freiburg) as an acknowledgement of gratitude by the university and the citizens of Freiburg.

In the 1880s, the population of the student body and faculty started to grow quickly. The scientific reputation of Albert Ludwigs University attracted several researchers such as economist Adolph Wagner, historians Georg von Below and Friedrich Meinecke, and jurists Karl von Amira and Paul Lenel.

In 1900, Freiburg became the first German university to accept female students. Before there had been no women at German universities.

In the beginning of the 20th century, several new university buildings were built in the centre of Freiburg, such as the new main building in 1911. The university counted 3,000 students just before World War I. After World War I, the philosophers Edmund Husserl and Martin Heidegger (since 1928) taught at Albert Ludwigs University, as well as Edith Stein. In the field of social sciences, Walter Eucken developed the idea of ordoliberalism, which subsequently is known as the "Freiburg School".

=== Nazi Era ===
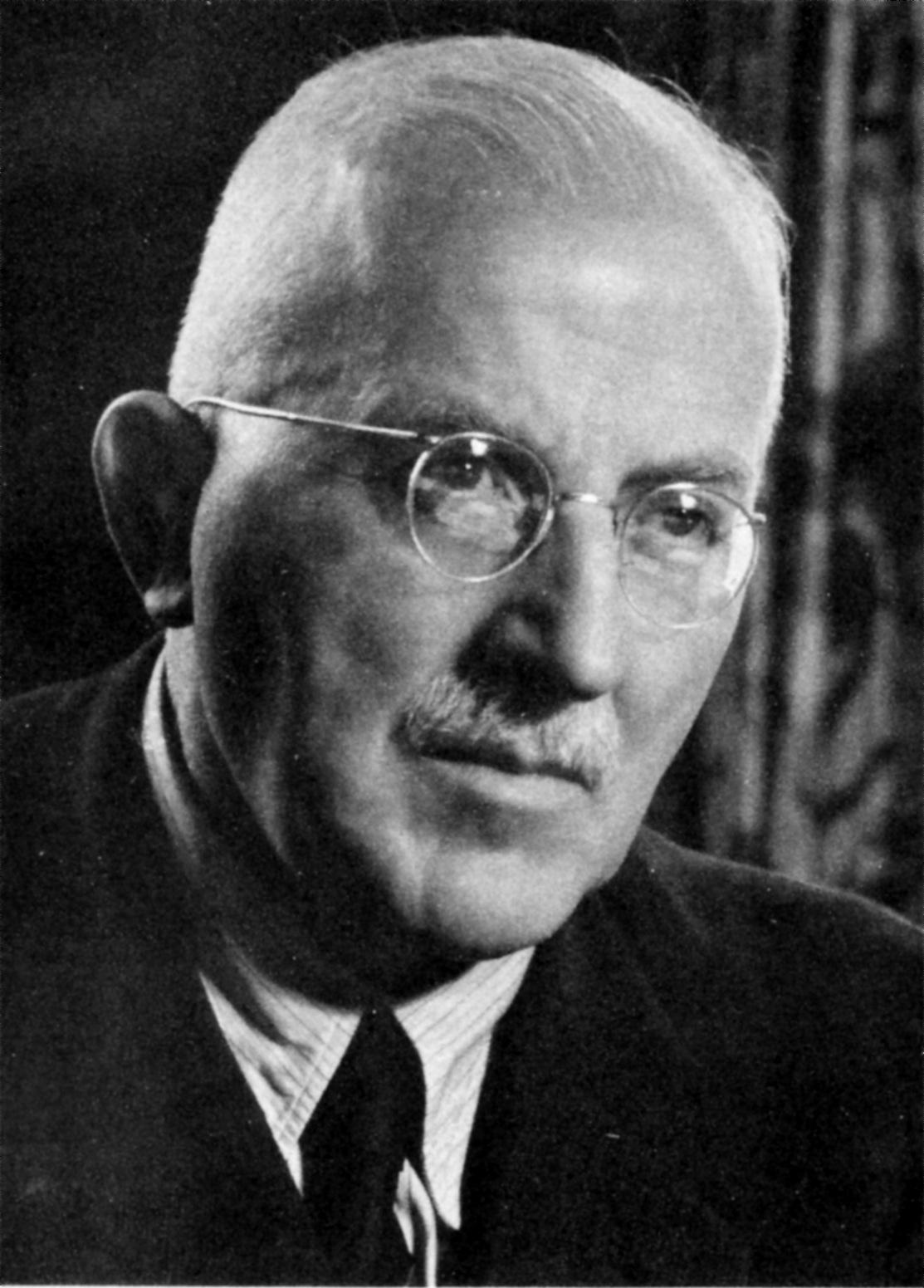
Hermann Staudinger

During the time of the Nazi dictatorship, the university went through the process of "political alignment" (Gleichschaltung) like the rest of the German universities. Under the rector Martin Heidegger, all Jewish faculty members were forced to leave the university in accordance with the Law for the Restoration of the Professional Civil Service. He also informed the Gestapo of the pacifist leanings of a distinguished Faculty member, Hermann Staudinger. The Nazi geneticist Eugen Fischer promoted racist views while a member of the university, ideas which were used to support the notorious Nuremberg laws passed by the Nazis.

=== Postwar years ===
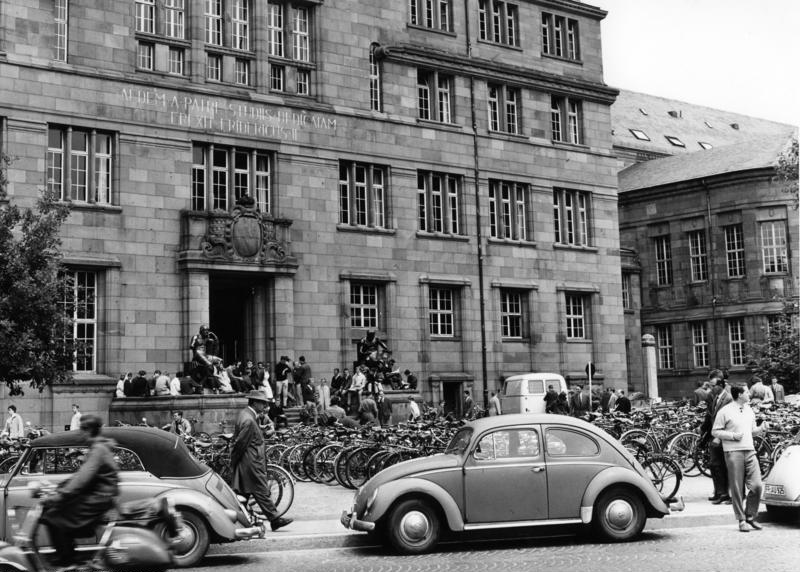
The University of Freiburg in 1961

After World War II, the University of Freiburg was reopened. New buildings for natural sciences were erected in the Institutsviertel ("institute quarter"). In the postwar years, the ideas of ordoliberalism, developed earlier by economists of the Freiburg School, such as Walter Eucken, Franz Böhm, Hans Grossmann-Doerth, and Leonhard Miksch, drove the creation of the German social market economy and its attendant Wirtschaftswunder. Nobel Prize winner and former professor at the University of Freiburg, Friedrich Hayek, is also associated with this theory. He directed the Walter Eucken Institut, an economic think tank in Freiburg cooperating with the university. Arnold Bergstraesser, considered a founding father or German political science after World War II, was also a professor at the University of Freiburg. His research group later formed what is now the Arnold Bergstraesser Institute for sociocultural research at the university.

In the late 20th century, the university was part of a mass education campaign and expanded rapidly. The student body grew to 10,000 by the 1960s, and doubled to 20,000 students by 1980. In the 1970s, the faculty structure was changed to 14 departments, with the Faculty of Engineering becoming the 15th faculty in 1994. In 2002, the number of faculties was reduced to 11. The university opened a memorial dedicated to the victims of National Socialism among the students, staff, and faculty in 2003.

In 2006, the University of Freiburg joined the League of European Research Universities (LERU). One year later, the university was chosen as one of nine German Universities of Excellence. However, it did not receive the third line of funding in 2012.

=== University seal ===
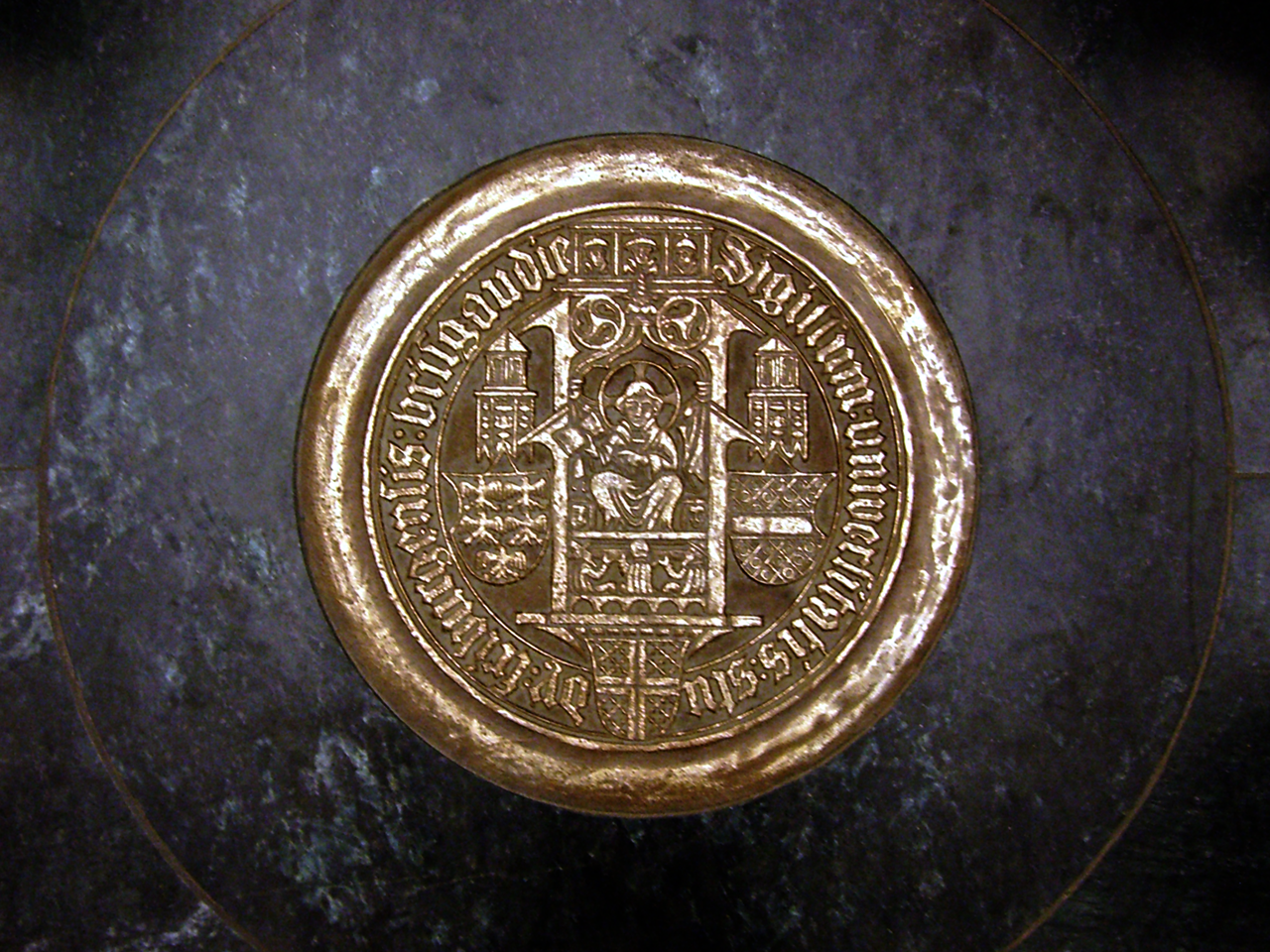
The university seal is set into the floor at the entrance of the largest lecture hall – auditorium maximum.

The seal of the University of Freiburg depicts Christ seated on a gothic throne holding the gospel in his right hand with the temple curtain in the background. Christ offers the teachings of the gospel to the Jewish scholars who are crouched at his feet. To the left and right of Christ are structures resembling towers, most likely symbolic of the Temple of Jerusalem. Located to the right of Christ is the coat of arms of the Austrian duchies, a banner with five eagles. The shield on the opposite side symbolizes the coat of arms used by the Habsburgs in conjunction with their territories. The coat of arms of the city of Freiburg is located at the bottom of the seal, displaying St George's Cross. The Latin inscription on the seal reads Sigillum universitatis studii friburgensis brisgaudie. The seal was slightly modified in 1913, but has otherwise been in continuous use since it was adopted in 1462.

== Campus ==
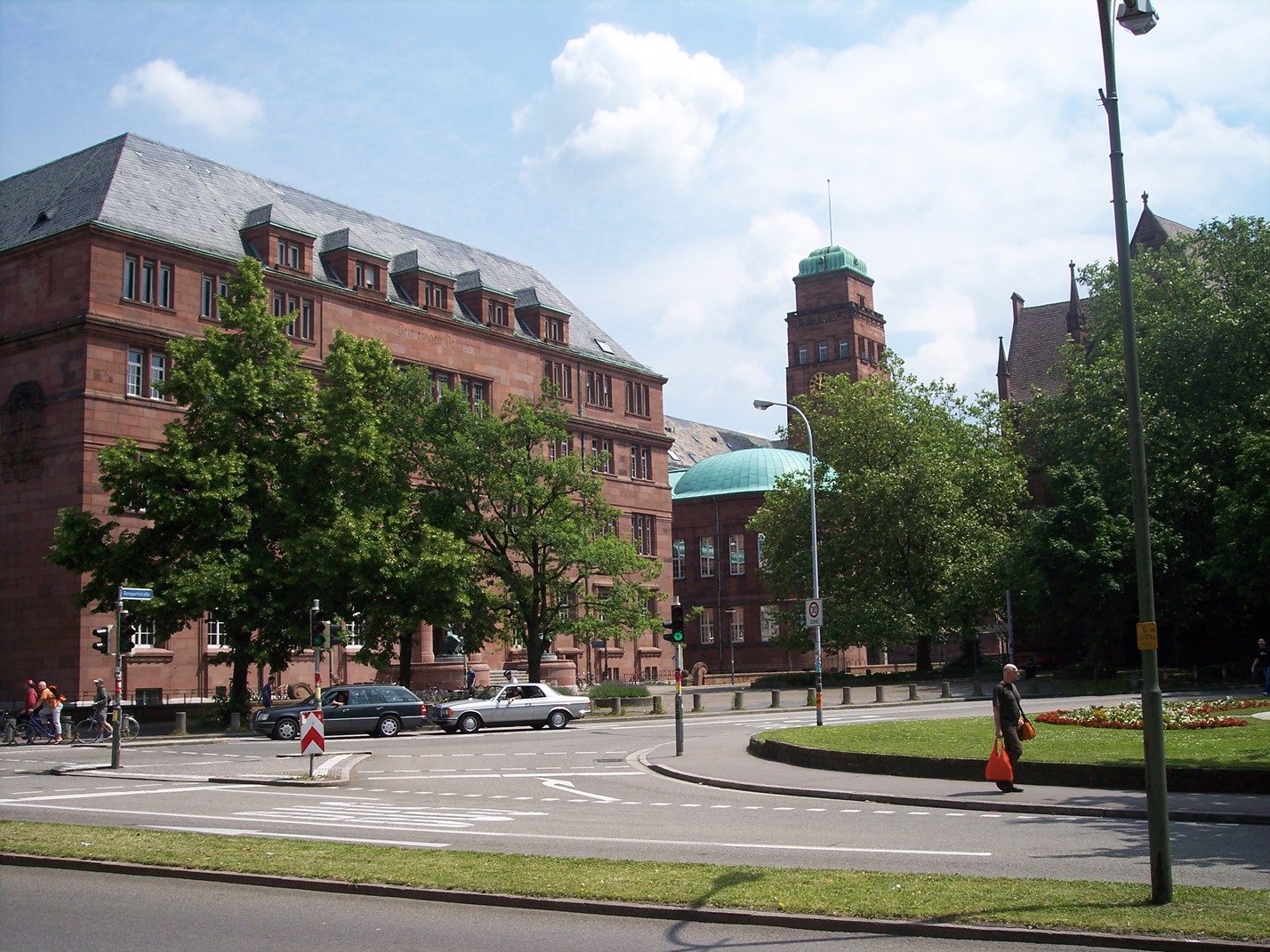
Kollegiengebäude I, erected in 1913 as the main building of the university

Having grown with the city since the 15th century, the university's buildings are deeply intertwined with the city. The three large campuses are the university center next to the historical city center, the institutes quarter, and the engineering campus, but other buildings can be found scattered throughout Freiburg.

The university complex in the historical center of Freiburg contains such picturesque buildings as the Jugendstil Kollegiengebäude I(short: "KG I"), built in 1911 by Hermann Billing, and the gothic revival old university library. The current University Library is also located in the historical center; it is a monumental building erected in the 1970s, and was to be renovated and redesigned beginning in September 2008. It is one of the largest in Germany and placed fourth in an October 2007, German national ranking of university libraries.

The University Church, located across from Kollegiengebäude II (short: "KG II"), was built in 1683 by the Jesuit order. The church and the Jesuit college were handed over to the university after the Jesuit order was suppressed in 1773. The church was destroyed in the 27 November 1944, bombing raid on Freiburg, and reconstructed in 1956.

The "institute quarter" (Institutsviertel) is home to the science faculties. This campus was destroyed almost completely in the Freiburg bombing raid in 1944. After World War II, the reconstruction of the institutes began. Today, the quarter houses the physics buildings, the tall main chemistry building, visible from afar, the famous Institute for Macromolecular Chemistry at the Hermann-Staudinger-Haus, various other science buildings, and the preclinical institutes of the Faculty of Medicine.

The engineering campus is located next to the small Freiburg airfield to the northwest of the city center, close to the University Medical Center. The campus is home to the Institut für Mikrosystemtechnik ( Department of Microsystems Engineering) and the Department of Computer Science. With the addition of the Faculty of Engineering, the University of Freiburg became the first classical university to combine traditional disciplines with microsystems technologies.

The University Medical Center (Universitätsklinikum Freiburg) is one of Germany's largest medical centers. It boasts 1,600 beds and handles 55,000 in-patients a year, with another 357,000 being treated as out-patients. It consists of 13 specialized clinics, five clinical institutes, and five centers (e.g. Center for Transplantation Medicine). The University Medical Center achieved many technical advances, such as the first implantation of an artificial heart Jarvik 2000 in 2002.

Most recently, the University of Freiburg purchased a large historic villa in the district of Herdern, which will house part of the literature and linguistics, as well as history departments of the Freiburg Institute for Advanced Studies.

In 2015, the University of Freiburg opened its new library, housed in a modern building with a large glass and chrome facade. The library features a section for quiet work and the permanent collection as well as space for group work, where collaboration is encouraged. The building also includes a student cafe and an outdoor plaza with modern sculpture.

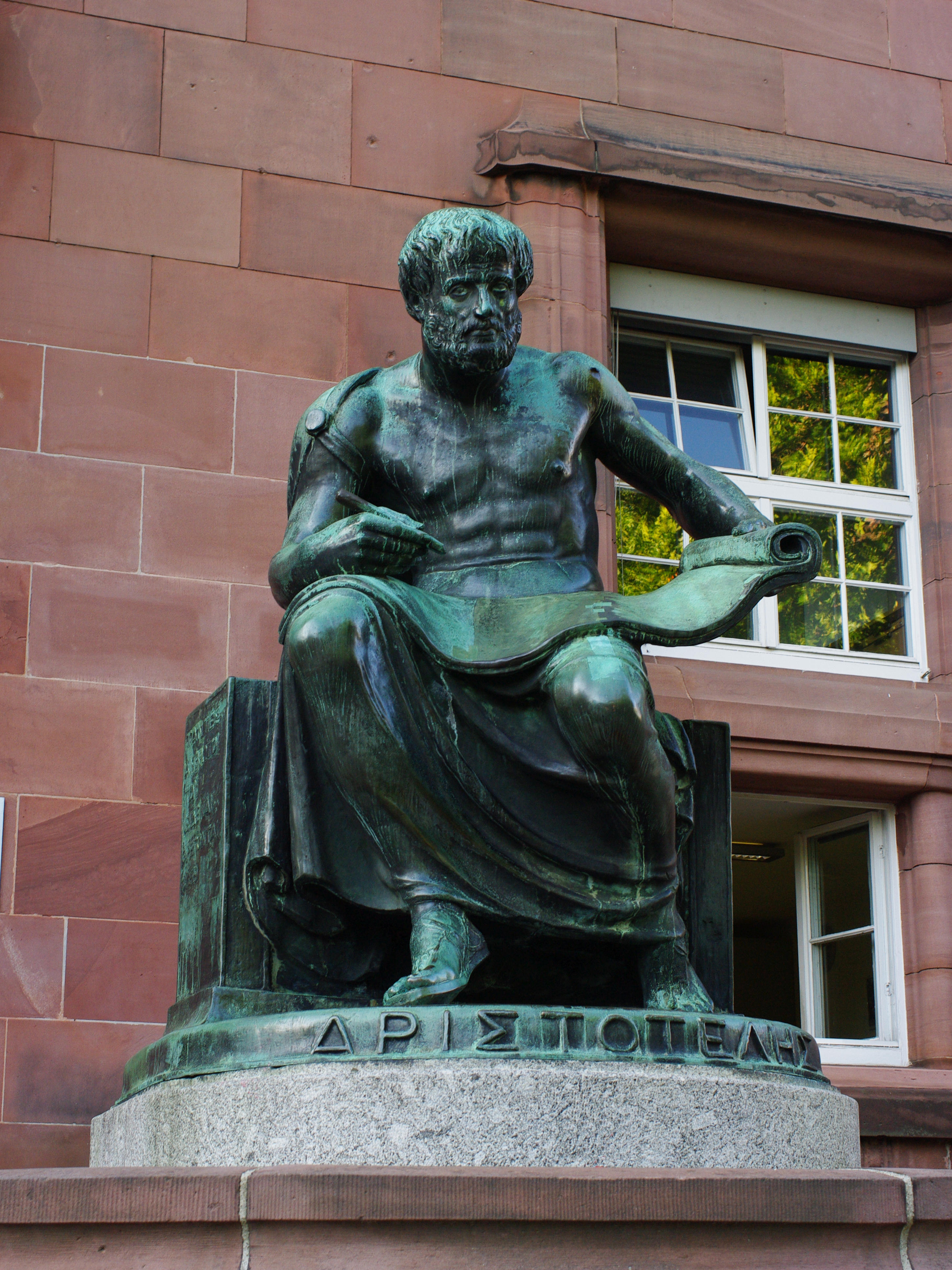
Aristotle, in front of Kollegiengebäude I

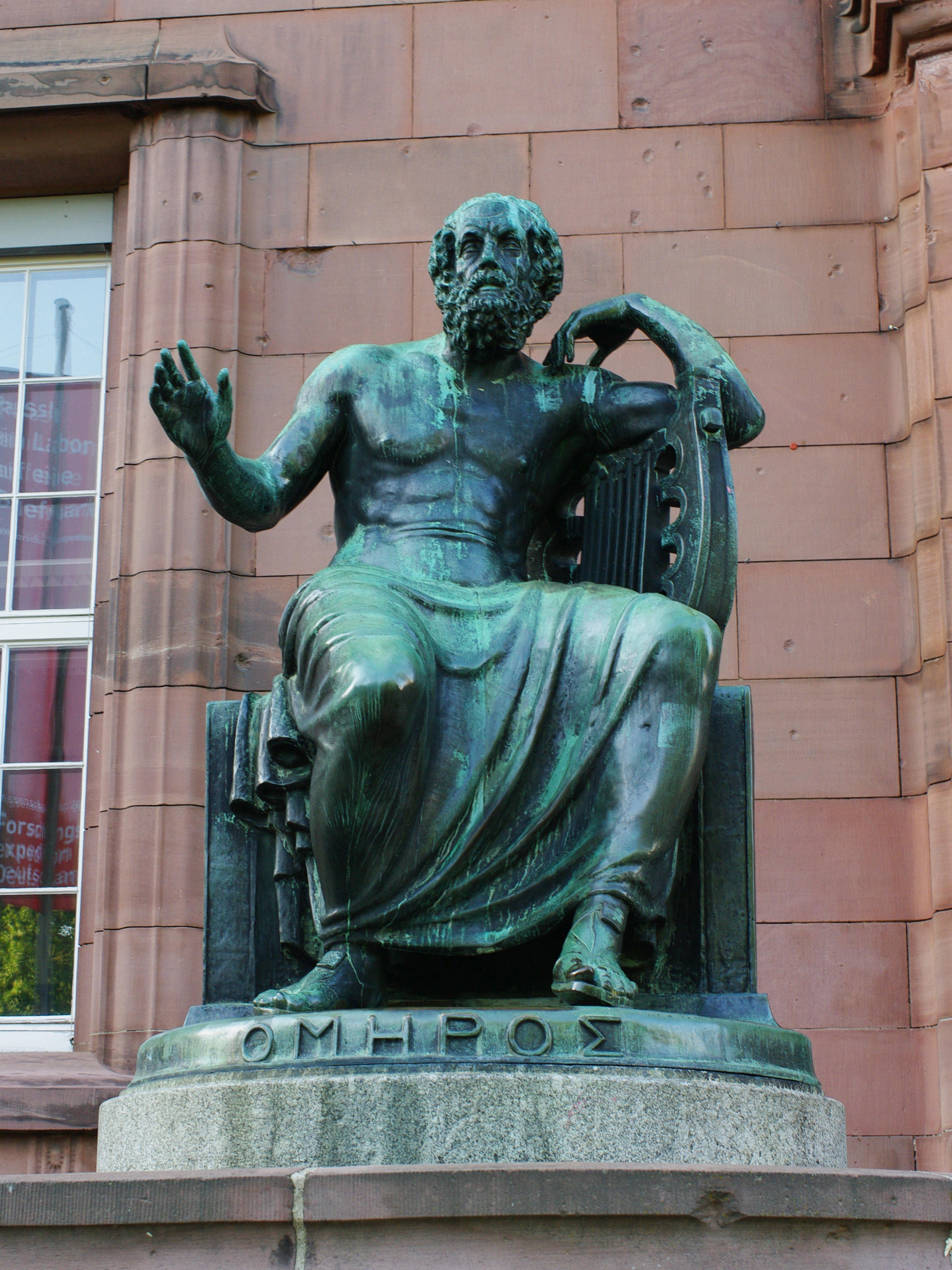
Homer

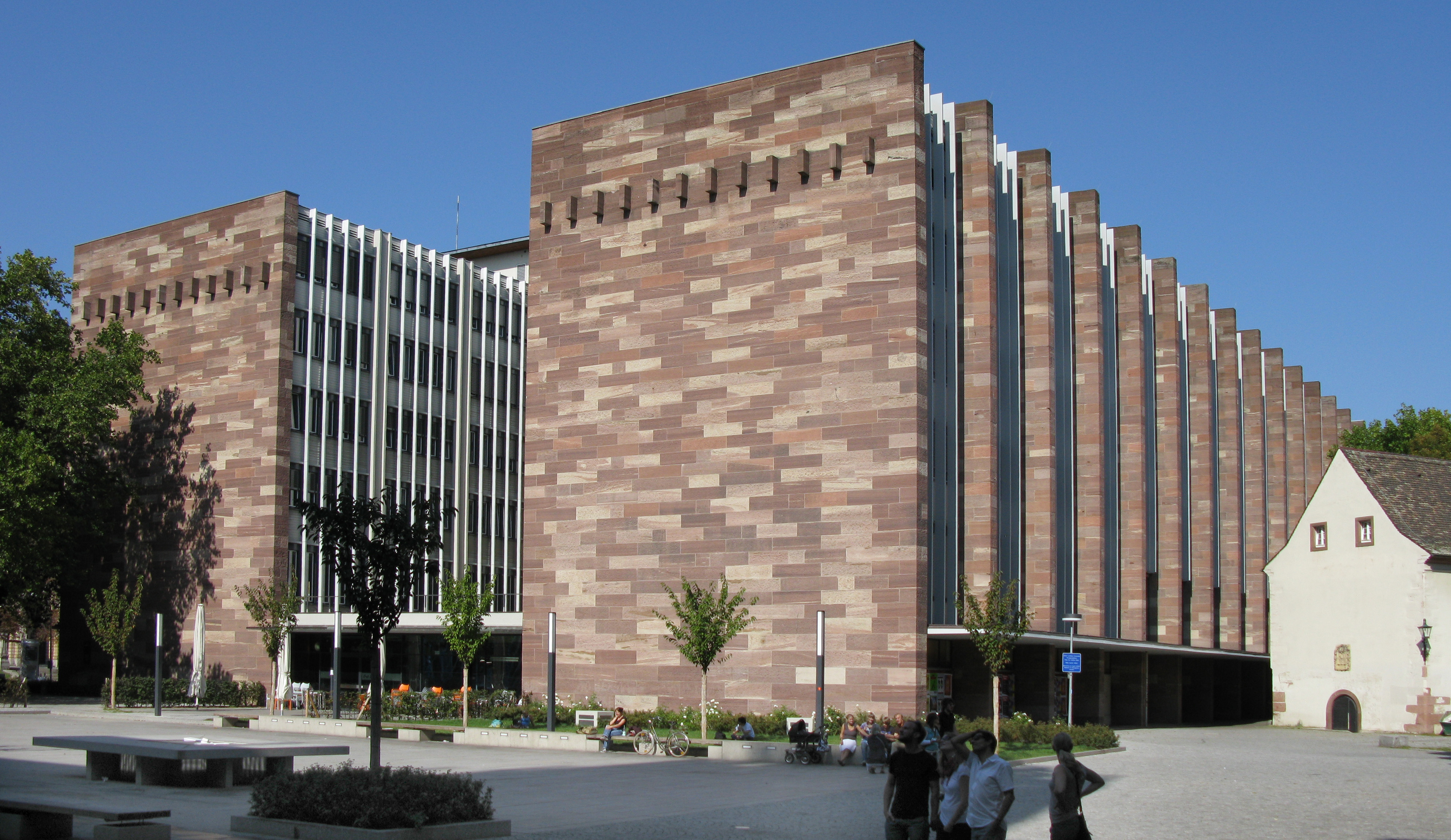
Kollegiengebäude II and central university square

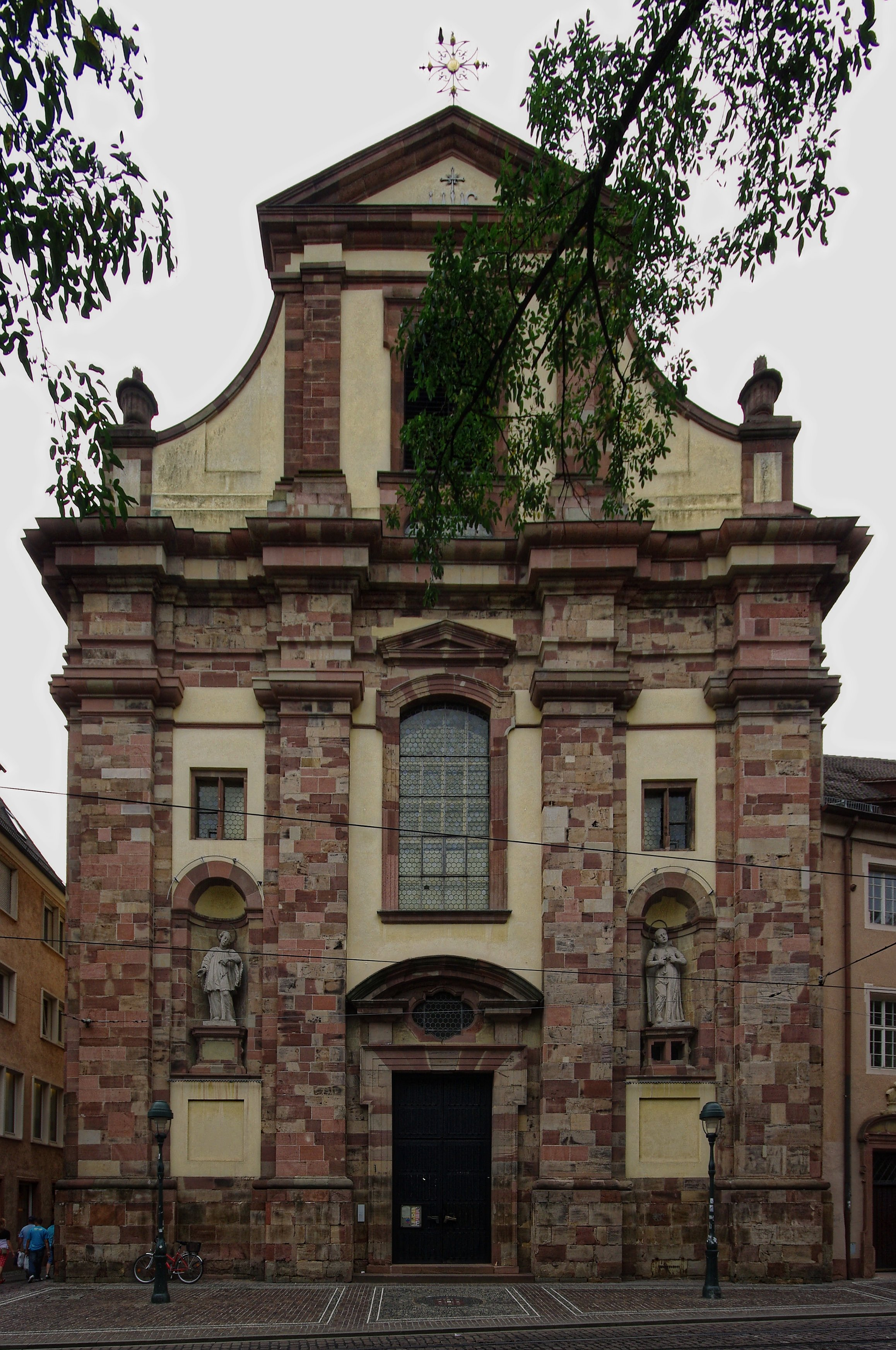
University Church

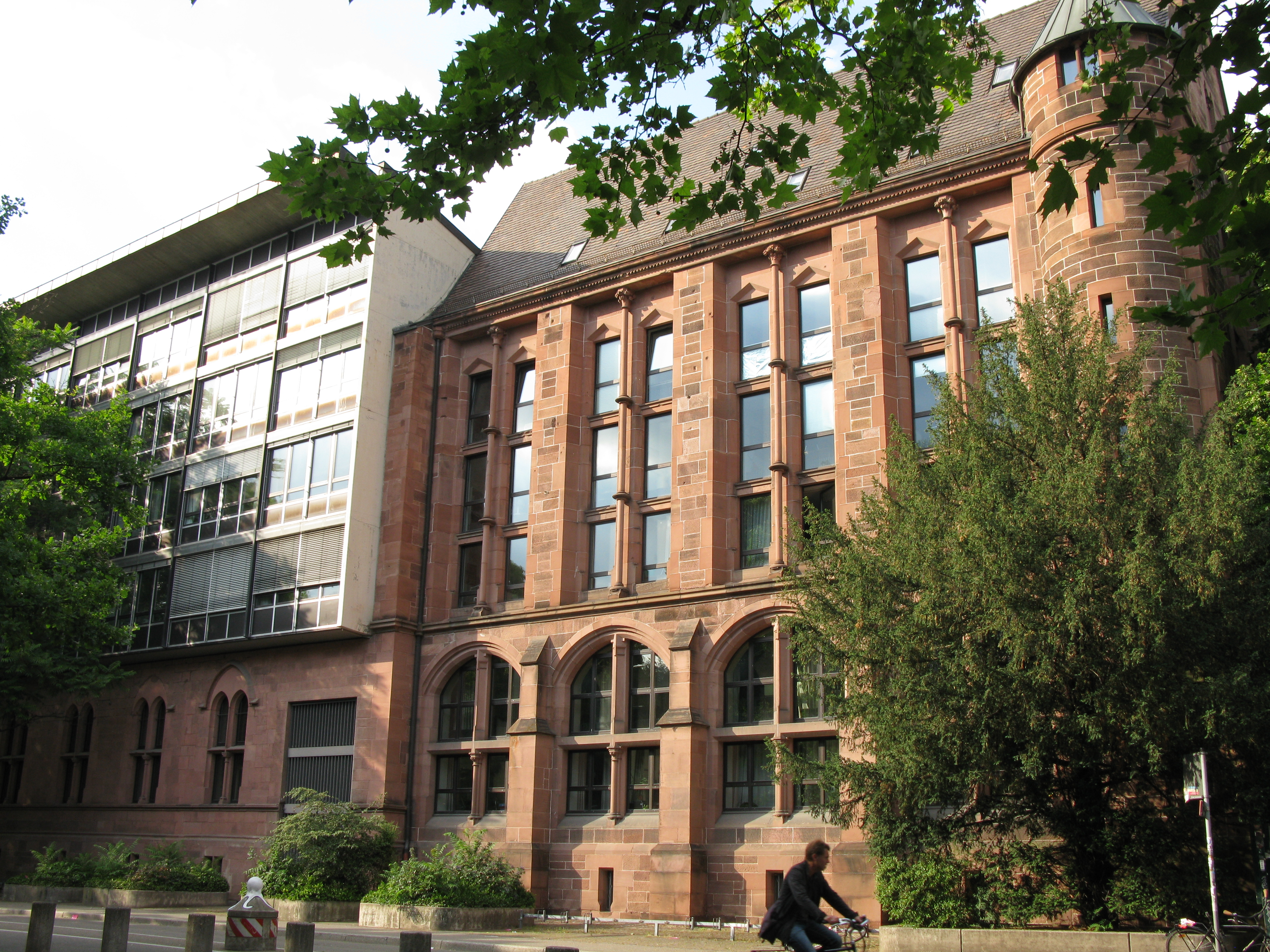
Kollegiengebäude IV, Humanities Faculty (former University Library)

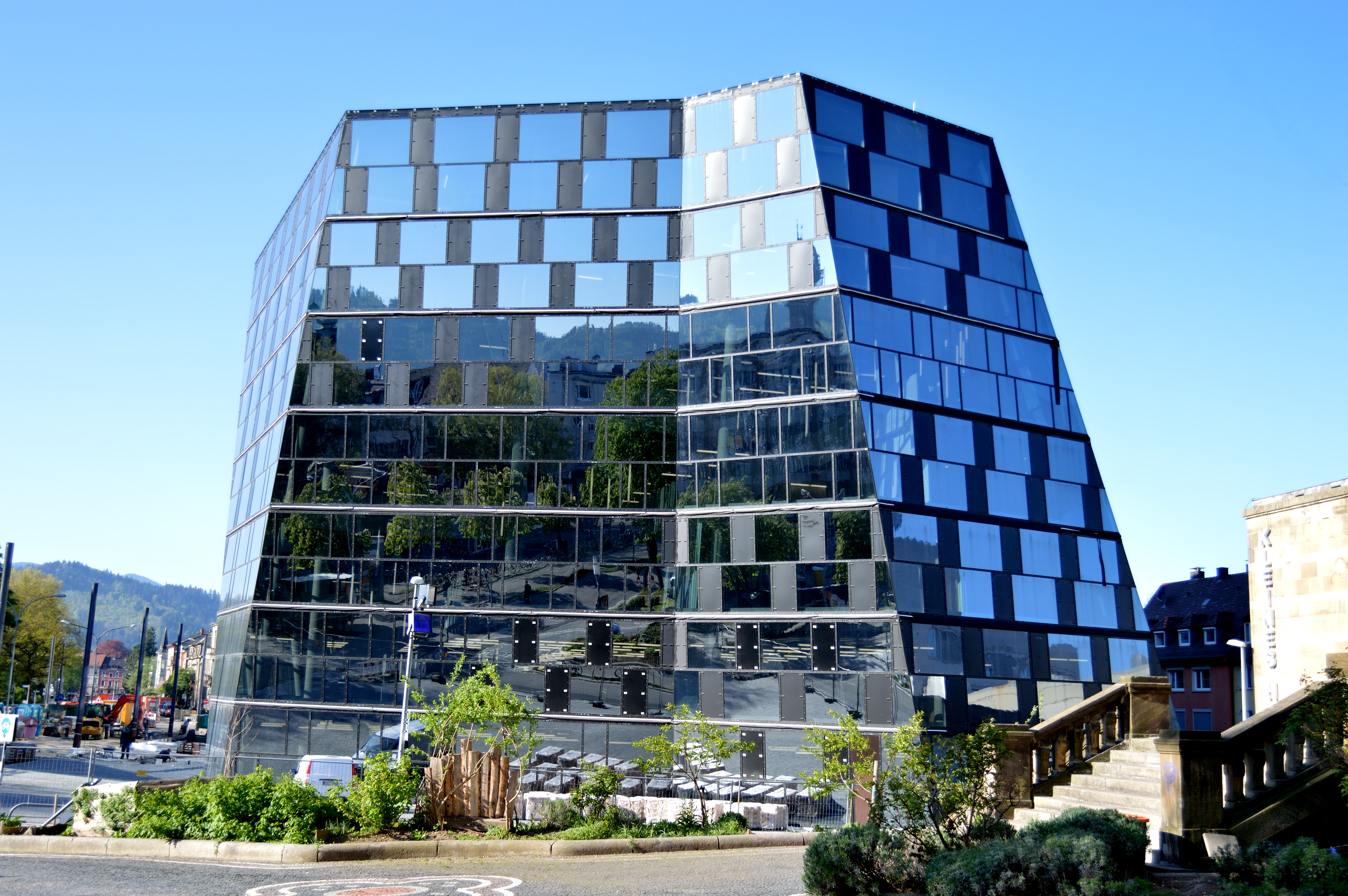
The University Library in Freiburg

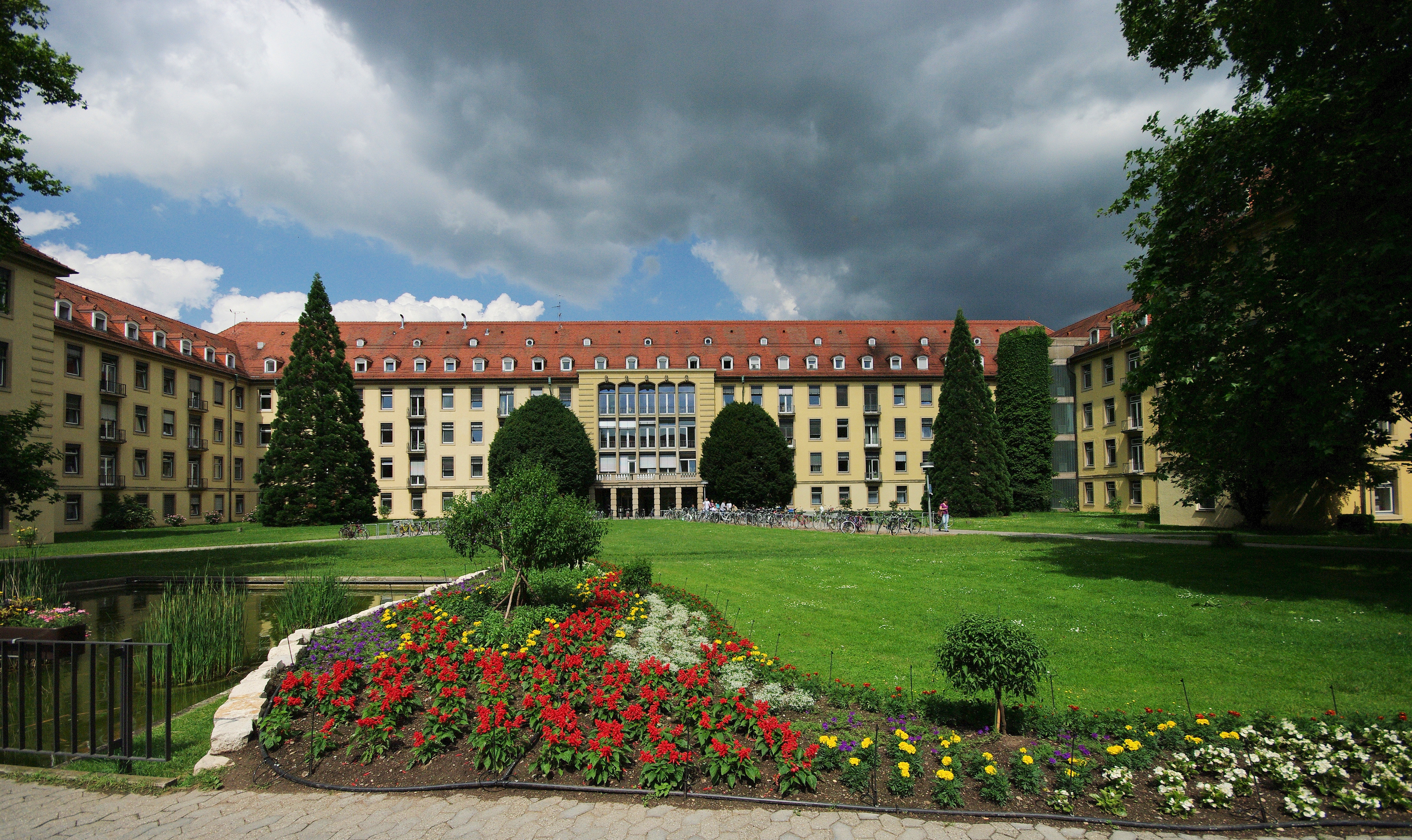
The Department of Surgery at the University Medical Center

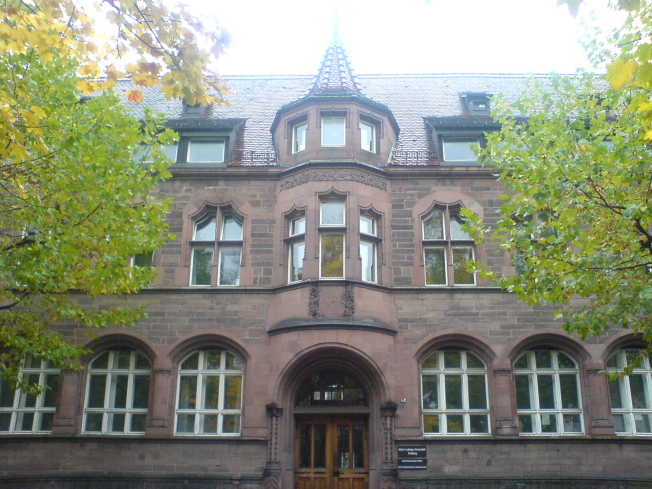
The Institute for Medical Ethics and History of Medicine and the Institute for Biostatistics and Medical Informatics at the Faculty of Medicine

== Students and admission ==
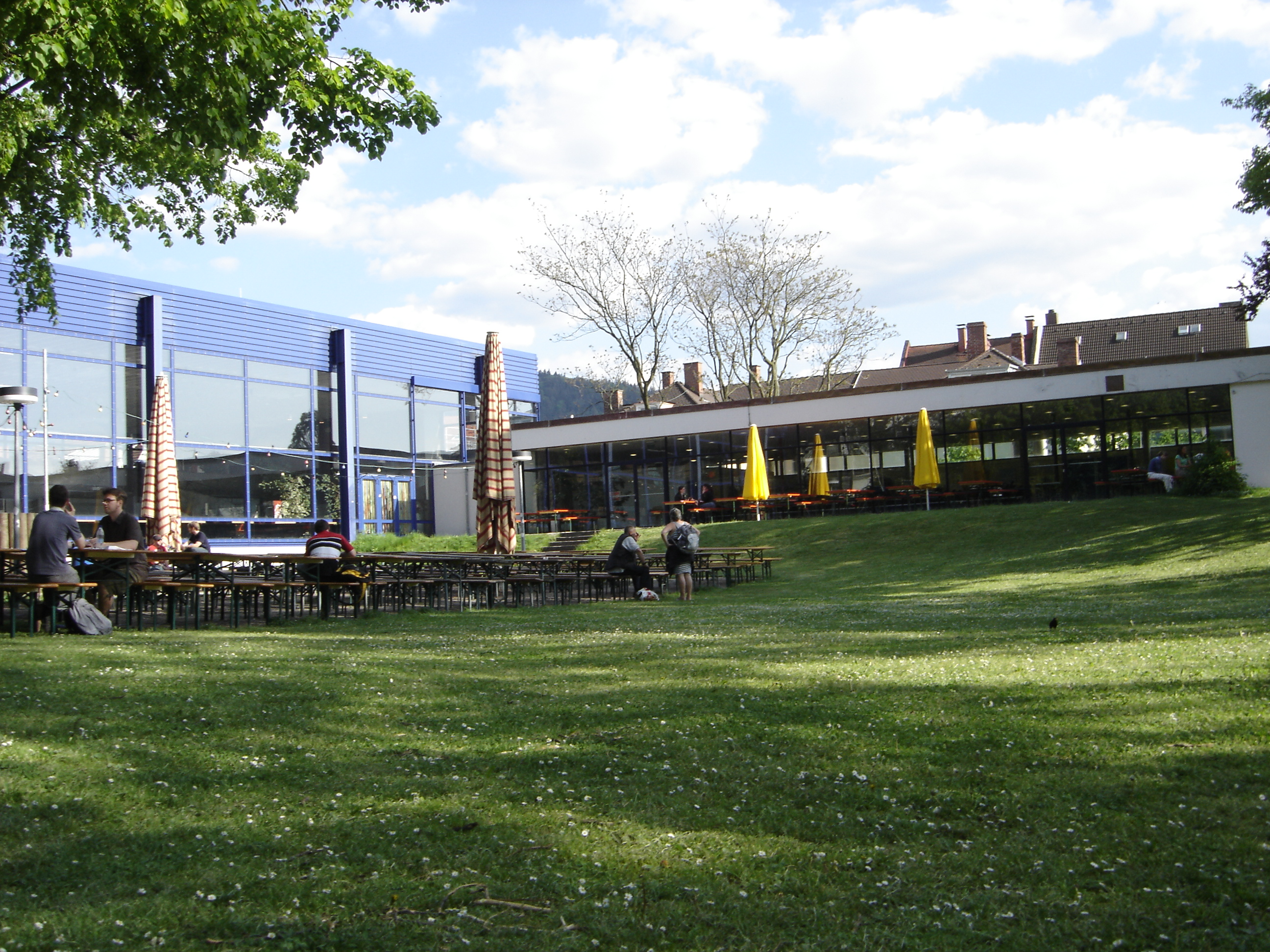
The green at the central Mensa (cafeteria) on Rempartstraße

The university has a combined undergraduate and graduate student population of around 21,600. About 16% of these students are foreigners, from about 120 countries. Admission largely depends on the faculty and program applied for and is strictly merit based, with the average score of final secondary-school examinations (German Abitur) or A-levels playing an important role. Overall, in the fall of 2010, roughly 4,000 of around 26,000 applicants were admitted: this means that the university's acceptance rate that year was equal to 15.38%.

The University of Freiburg offers a large variety of undergraduate, graduate, and postdoctoral degree programs at its 11 faculties in 150 fields of study.

As common among German universities, the academic year consists of summer and winter terms (semesters). The winter term runs from 1 October to 31 March, while the summer term runs from 1 April to 30 September. However, lectures and classes usually do not run for the full duration of these periods and allow for breaks in spring and fall.

As a German university, tuition is mostly free. The University of Freiburg currently has a semester fee of 180 EUR for all undergraduate and most graduate and doctoral programs. Additionally, since autumn 2017, non-EU students are charged 1500 EUR tuition fee per semester.

=== Student life ===
Numerous student clubs and organizations are active, among them a campus news station, uniCROSS which is a cross-media platform run by students. It consists of the "uniFM" team, which brings the news as a radio format, the "uniTV" team, producing videos and the "uniONLINE" team which is responsible for the magazine. Because of the nearby French and Swiss borders and the adjacent Black Forest, where the university owns a retreat on Schauinsland Mountain, fine opportunities exist for leisure and outdoor activities.

The university provides student housing in its various dormitories, run by the Studentenwerk. Additionally, further dormitories in Freiburg are operated by other institutions, such as the Catholic Archdiocese. Due to the affordable rent and limited spots, rooms in the various dormitories are very popular. Many students find private living arrangements, such as Wohngemeinschaften (shared apartments). However, the popularity of Freiburg for prospective students can make finding an apartment or room quite time-consuming, especially before the start of the academic terms.

The university has its own career center, singled out as one of the best in Germany by the Stifterverband für die Deutsche Wissenschaft.

== Academic profile ==
=== Excellence initiative ===
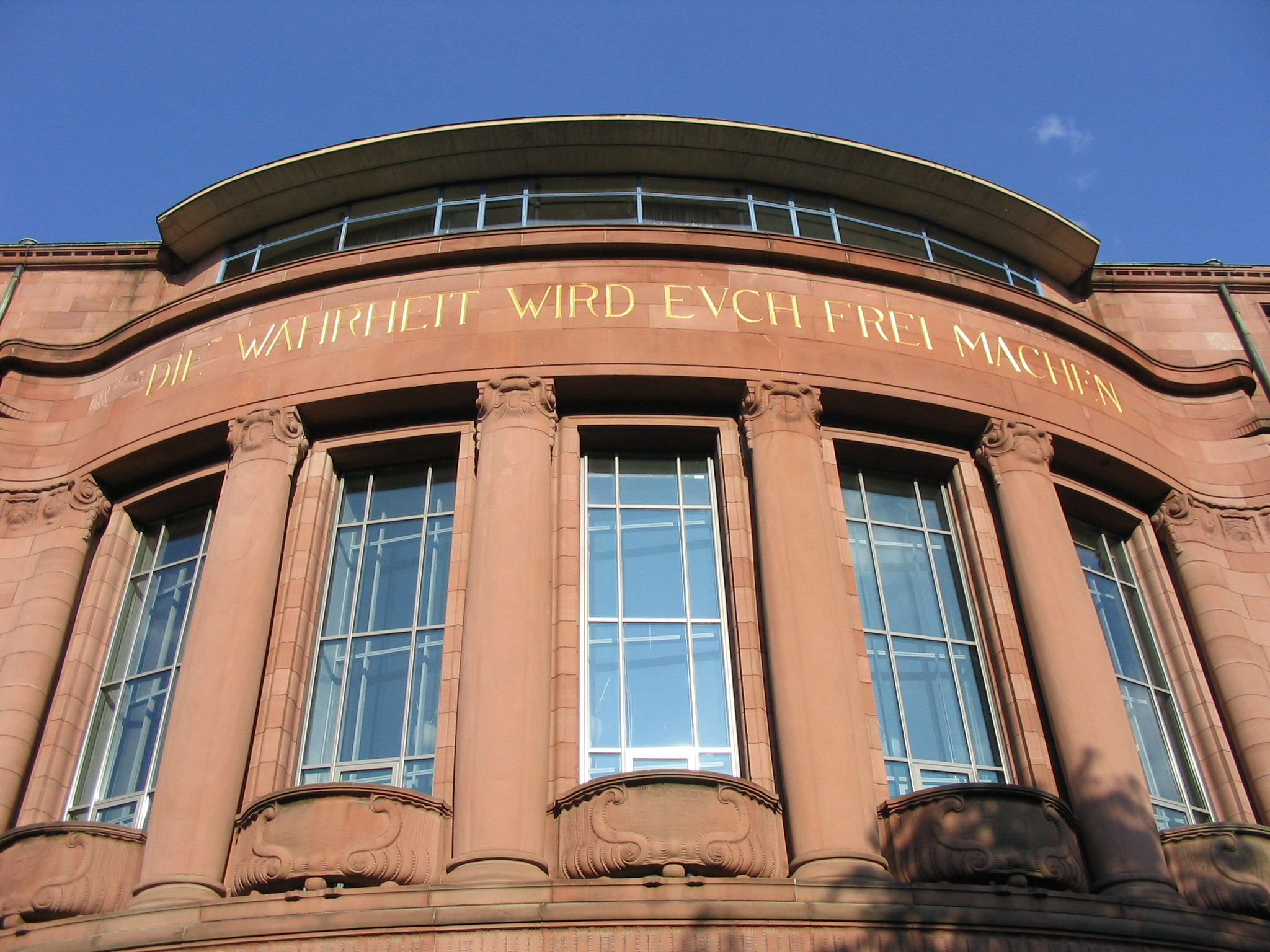
"Die Wahrheit wird euch frei machen" (The truth will set you free)

The university scored well with its submissions to the German Universities Excellence Initiative. The university received funding in all three categories. In the first category, funding for a new graduate school, the Spemann Graduate School of Biology and Medicine, was granted; in the second, funding was granted for the excellence cluster Centre for Biological Signalling Studies (bioss); and in the third category, Institutional Strategy Line of Funding, open only to institutions with submissions qualified in the first two categories, the university is receiving funding for "Windows for Research", which aims to promote a high level of interdisciplinarity between research fields and attract scientists from all over the world. To that end, the university founded the Freiburg Institute for Advanced Studies (FRIAS). Being selected for the third category ranks Freiburg as one of nine "excellence universities" in Germany. The university is to receive over EUR 130 million in additional funds over five years (from 2007) from this third category of funding. In 2009, the university was also successful in a nationwide competition for excellence in teaching, held by the Stifterverband der deutschen Wissenschaft. The University of Freiburg, with its plans for future innovative teaching concepts, was selected as one of 10 winners from a field of over 100 higher education institutions.

In 2012, in the third round of the Excellence Initiative, the university was able to successfully extend funding for the Spemann Graduate School of Biology and Medicine, as well as bioss, while also gaining funding for a new cluster called BrainLinks-Brain Tools, an interdisciplinary neurotechnology project. Citing insufficient evidence of integration of the FRIAS concept into the university's framework, the committee did not extend funding for the FRIAS and the institutional strategy line of funding, despite acknowledging the impressive research and advances achieved at FRIAS in the past years.

=== Rankings ===
University rankings

Overall – Global & National
QS World 2026	201	10
THE World 2026	138	12
ARWU World 2026	101–150	5

The University of Freiburg is recognized in several university ranking systems. In the QS World University Rankings 2024, it holds the 192nd position globally and the 9th position nationally. The Times Higher Education World University Rankings 2024 placed it 128th in the world and 11th in Germany. The Academic Ranking of World Universities (ARWU) 2023 ranks it between 101st and 150th globally, and 5th nationally.

In university rankings published in 2007 and 2008 by German magazines and periodicals (Der Spiegel, Die Zeit, Focus, etc.) the University of Freiburg has established itself as one of Germany's top universities. The faculties for law, medicine, economics, history, English studies, German studies, biology, dentistry, and pharmacology achieve especially high scores. In regards to the natural sciences, the University of Freiburg ranked sixth in Europe and second in Germany in a ranking from 2003 of the European Commission of the universities according to their overall impact on scientific research. The Centre for Higher Education Development, a German higher education think tank, periodically publishes comprehensive rankings of European Master's and PhD programs. In 2016, Freiburg garnered five spots in the top Excellence Group among seven subject fields examined. In a recent survey by the Nature Publishing Group, the Nature Publishing Index – 2012 Global Top 100, the University of Freiburg was the highest-ranked German university and ranked 66th worldwide and 18th in Europe. A recent study, "Benchmarking China and Germany: An Analysis of Patent Portfolios of Universities and Research Organizations", was published in May 2013 and sought to evaluate leading universities and research institutions in Germany and China in regards to their patent applications. The study placed the University of Freiburg as the third-most innovative university in Germany in terms of total patent applications.

==== By subject ====
QS World University Rankings by subject, 2023
Subject	Global	National
Arts and humanities	▼115	6
Linguistics	101–150	4–10
Theology, divinity, and religious studies	101–140	▲11–12
Archaeology	101–150	▼9–12
Classics and ancient history	▲49	▲7
English language and literature	▼88	▼5
History	101–150	▲6–8
Modern languages	101–150	5–7
Philosophy	101–150	▼8–12
Engineering and technology	N/A	N/A
Computer science and information systems	201–250	9–12
Engineering – Electrical and electronic	301–350	10–11
Engineering – Petroleum	51–100	1–2
Engineering – Mechanical	▲401–450	14–15
Life sciences and medicine	▼132	6
Agriculture and forestry	▲101–150	5–9
Anatomy and physiology	▼51–100	2–6
Biological sciences	▲100	▼7
Dentistry	51–80	1–4
Medicine	▲130	7
Pharmacy and pharmacology	201–250	▲11–12
Psychology	201–250	▲10–15
Natural sciences	N/A	N/A
Chemistry	▲151–200	13–14
Environmental sciences	▼151–200	▼6–10
Geography	▼151–200	▼8–10
Social sciences and management	▼386	▲11
Education and training	201–250	▼8–10
Law and legal studies	101–150	▼6–7
Politics	201–230	9
Sociology	201–250	12

THE World University Rankings by subject, 2023
Subject	Global	National
Arts and humanities	▼ =69	6
Social sciences	176–200	9–13
Computer science	▲78	7
Engineering	▼151–175	▼8–9
Clinical and health	▲ =90	▲5
Life sciences	▲62	7
Physical sciences	▼176–200	▼16–17
Psychology	▲101–125	10–13

ARWU global ranking of academic subjects, 2022
Subject	Global	National
Natural sciences
Mathematics	201–300	12–18
Physics	201–300	▲13–23
Chemistry	201–300	▲16–25
Earth sciences	201–300	17–23
Geography	▲151–200	▼8–13
Ecology	51–75	▼4–6
Atmospheric science	201–300	▲15–20
Engineering
Electrical and electronic engineering	▼301–400	▼8–15
Instruments science and technology	201–300	▲3–6
Biomedical engineering	101–150	6–10
Computer science and engineering	▲101–150	▲2
Materials science and engineering	301–400	▲16–21
Nanoscience and nanotechnology	▼301–400	▲18–27
Energy science and engineering	▼201–300	▼8–10
Environmental science and engineering	▼301–400	▲11–21
Water resources	76–100	▲1–3
Biotechnology	▲101–150	▲5–7
Remote sensing	51–75	3–4
Life sciences
Biological sciences	76–100	▼6–11
Human biological sciences	51–75	▲6–8
Agricultural sciences	▼76–100	▼5
Medical sciences
Clinical medicine	▼301–400	▼23–30
Public health	401–500	▼23–25
Dentistry and oral sciences	76–100	5–7
Medical technology	▼40	▼5
Pharmacy and pharmaceutical sciences	76–100	▼7–9
Social sciences
Economics	301–400	▲16–23
Statistics	151–200	▼7–11
Political sciences	201–300	▼13–16
Education	151–200	▲3–7
Psychology	101–150	▲5–11
Management	401–500	15–26
Public administration	101–150	6–7

=== Current affairs ===
Teams of the University of Freiburg frequently participate in academic competitions with considerable success. The moot court team of the Faculty of Law has been the most successful team in the history of the competition Willem C. Vis International Commercial Arbitration Moot. The humanoid robot team of the Faculty of Engineering regularly competes with distinction in international tournaments. The University of Freiburg team has also repeatedly scored highly at the International Genetically Engineered Machine undergraduate synthetic biology competition held at the Massachusetts Institute of Technology. The team was supported by numerous university institutions, among them the recently established bioss cluster of excellence. The University of Freiburg also participates in the National Model United Nations held annually in New York City.

The genetically engineered golden rice was developed by the University of Freiburg (Peter Beyer) and the ETH Zurich (Ingo Potrykus) from 1992 to 2000. It was considered a breakthrough in biotechnology at the time of publication and now can help to provide vitamin A to people lacking access to it in their diets.

When previous rector Jäger retired in 2008, law professor Andreas Voßkuhle was chosen as his successor. However, shortly after the start of his term, the Social Democratic Party of Germany nominated Voßkuhle as vice-president of the Federal Constitutional Court of Germany. Voßkuhle accepted the nomination, was confirmed, and took his seat on the court in May 2008. In July 2008, then vice-rector Hans-Jochen Schiewer was elected as successor to Voßkuhle. Schiewer has assumed the position of rector with the start of the winter term 2008/2009.

The University of Freiburg offers educational audio and video contents on the iTunes U software platform since January 2008.

The University of Freiburg Institute of Physics is actively involved with research at the Large Hadron Collider and has contributed significantly to the ATLAS experiment, resulting in the discovery of the Higgs boson in 2012.

== Organization and faculties ==
Today, about 430 professors, 3,695 academic employees, and 8,644 non-academic employees at the university are working for the Albert Ludwigs University, making it Freiburg's and the region's biggest employer. The university attracts many academics from abroad and was awarded excellent positions in the 2005 and 2009 Humboldt Ranking.

=== Faculties ===
The university is headed by a rector and divided into 11 faculties:

- Faculty of Theology
- Faculty of Law
- Faculty of Medicine
- Faculty of Economics and Behavioural Sciences
- Faculty of Philology
- Faculty of Philosophy (history, sociology, etc.)
- Faculty of Mathematics and Physics
- Faculty of Chemistry, Pharmacy, and Geosciences
- Faculty of Biology
- Faculty of Forest and Environmental Sciences
- Faculty of Engineering

=== University College Freiburg ===
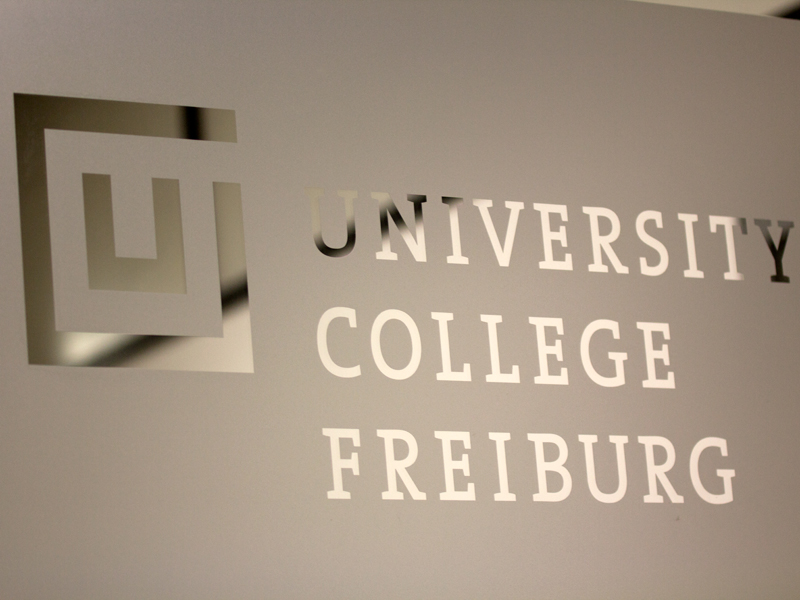
Logo at the entrance of University College Freiburg

University College Freiburg (UCF) is the university's central facility for promoting and administering international, interdisciplinary teaching activities. It was established in 2012 and is situated in the historical buildings of the old university, the historical site of the artes liberales. UCF serves as a lab for innovative teaching approaches and instructional design at the University of Freiburg and works in close co-operation with the faculties and the Rectorate's departments for Instructional Development and International Relations. It is accredited by the University of Freiburg, which draws its authority from the Central Evaluation and Accreditation Agency.

The four-year, English-taught Bachelor program in Liberal Arts and Sciences (LAS) is UCF's major offering, the first of its kind in Germany. It emphasizes a broad interdisciplinary education, while at the same time providing for individualized academic concentrations on a high academic level. Students have to complete 240 ECTS credits and are able to major in life sciences, environmental and sustainability sciences, culture and history and governance. Electives can be taken at UCF, in the greater University of Freiburg, during studies abroad or in the form of internships and self-directed practical projects.

In order to provide a framework and didactic guidance for interdisciplinary higher education, the University of Freiburg has established two chairs at UCF: Epistemology and Theory of Science (Prof. Dr. Frieder Vogelmann, who is also the dean of studies) and Science and Technology Studies (Prof. Dr. Veronika Lipphardt). The college and the program are directed by Managing Director Paul Sterzel and the Academic Coordinator Thorsten Leiendecker.

UCF is a member of the European Colleges of Liberal Arts and Sciences and of EPICUR, a group of eight universities in six countries that explore a modern and internationally connected university experience Students are able to participate in a double degree program with the University College Maastricht.

Students at UCF organize a number of interest groups, for instance a magazine publishing group, a 3D printing group, an arts collective, and a Model United Nations team. They represented by an elected board of twelve student office holders. Alumni are a part of a subgroup within the greater University of Freiburg alumni association.

=== Graduate schools ===
The University of Freiburg has a variety of graduate education and research opportunities. In an evaluation of European graduate programs, Freiburg was ranked among the leading universities in several subject fields examined.

One of the notable graduate opportunities is the Freiburg Institute for Advanced Studies, a project funded by the German Excellence Initiative.

Apart from the many graduate programs of its faculties, Freiburg has set up additional specialized graduate schools and graduate research centers, coordinated by the newly founded International Graduate Academy (IGA) Freiburg. The IGA coordinates five graduate schools: the Spemann Graduate School of Biology and Medicine; the European Cultures and Intercultural Interweaving school; the Theology and Religious Studies school; the Hermann Paul School of Language Sciences, and the Environment, Society and Global Change graduate school of the Faculty of Forest and Environmental Sciences.

The IGA also coordinates 12 Graduate Research Centers (Graduiertenkolleg): Biochemistry of Enzymes; Friends, Patrons, Clients; Formation and Development of Present-Day Landscapes; Mathematical Logics and Applications; Mechanisms of Neuronal Signal Transduction; Catalysts and Catalytic Reactions for Organic Synthesis (in cooperation with the University of Basel); Particle Physics; Embedded Microsystems; From Cells to Organs: Molecular Mechanisms of Organogenesis; Signal Systems in Model Organisms of Plant Origin; Micro Energy Harvesting; and PhD program Computational Neuroscience at the Bernstein Center Freiburg for Computational Neuroscience and Neurotechnology.

Finally, the university operates three joint graduate schools with the Max Planck Society: the International Max Planck Research School for Molecular and Cellular Biology; the International Max Planck Research School on Retaliation, Mediation and Punishment; and the International Max Planck Research School for Comparative Criminal Law.

Together with the EUCOR universities of Basel and Strasbourg and the Karlsruhe Institute of Technology, the University of Freiburg also runs the shared graduate school École supérieure de biotechnologie Strasbourg, enabling the students to obtain an international degree in biotechnology and a trilingual education, as classes are taught in English, German, and French.

=== International language courses ===
The University of Freiburg has offered German language courses for foreign students since 1911. The courses take place at the university's Language Teaching Centre ('Sprachlehrinstitut') during the semester breaks and attract students from over 50 nations. The intensive language lessons are bolstered by a supplementary program with lectures and seminars on German culture, politics, philosophy, and art, as well as excursions to the Black Forest, the Alsace region in France, Basel (Switzerland) or Lake Constance. In addition to classes for all language levels, professional German courses (e.g. business German) are also offered.

== Sustainability ==
The city of Freiburg is known for its environmentally friendly policies and focus on renewable energy and sustainability, attracting solar industry and research to the city. This environmentally conscious attitude also extends to the University of Freiburg which has founded the work group "Nachhaltige Universität Freiburg" (Sustainable University of Freiburg) and has drawn up environmental guidelines to be implemented in university practice.

The university has also founded the initiative Solar-Uni Freiburg in 2007, with the aim of further expanding its capabilities in sustainability and environmental research. Solar panels were installed on the roofs of university buildings. To bundle renewable energy research and teaching at the university, the Center for Renewable Energy (ZEE, Zentrum für Erneuerbare Energien), an interdisciplinary and cross-faculty facility, was founded. Aside from research in the fields of solar energy, biomass, geothermal energy, energy efficiency and new energies, an international Master of Science degree in Renewable Energy Management is being offered.

In addition to its own expertise, the Center for Renewable Energy can draw upon the support of the renewable energy industrial sector in Freiburg, as well as the university's cooperation with other research institutes in the area, such as the Fraunhofer Institute for Solar Energy Systems ISE, the Öko-Institut – Institute for Applied Ecology, or the University of Applied Sciences Offenburg.

== University cooperation ==
=== Local partner institutions ===
The University of Freiburg cooperates closely with external research institutions located in Freiburg, several of which are connected with chairs at the university.

Collaborating institutions include:

- the Kiepenheuer-Institut für Sonnenphysik (KIS, solar physics)
- the Bernstein Center Freiburg
- the Max Planck Institute of Immunobiology and Epigenetics
- the Max Planck Institute for the Study of Crime, Security and Law (formerly known as Max Planck Institute for Foreign and International Criminal Law)
- the Max Planck Institute for Chemistry, Fire Ecology Research Group
- the Arnold Bergstraesser Institute for Socio-Cultural Research (ABI)
- the Fraunhofer Institute for Applied Solid-State Physics
- the Fraunhofer Institute for High-Speed Dynamics (Ernst-Mach-Institut)
- the Fraunhofer Institute for Physical Measurement Techniques
- the Fraunhofer Institute for Solar Energy Systems
- the Fraunhofer Institute for Mechanics of Materials
- the Confucius Institute
- the Walter Eucken Institut

=== International cooperation ===
The university is part of the regional EUCOR federation together with the Karlsruhe Institute of Technology, the universities of Basel, Mulhouse, and, marked by particularly close ties, Strasbourg. Freiburg is further a member of the League of European Research Universities; the European University Association; ASEA-Uninet; AC21; and the International Forum of Public Universities (IFPU). The university also has exchange agreements and cooperative efforts with universities on almost every continent.

The University of Freiburg initiated an English language international master's program in social sciences, the Global Studies Programme (GSP) in 2001. The aim of the program is to enable students to study social sciences in different regions and cultures. Combining various disciplines such as sociology, political sciences, anthropology and geography, students approach globalization with a unique perspective. The program is conducted jointly by the University of Freiburg with the University of Cape Town in Cape Town, South Africa, the Jawaharlal Nehru University in New Delhi, India, the Latin American Social Sciences Institute in Buenos Aires, Argentina, and the Chulalongkorn University in Bangkok, Thailand. Students in the GSP master's program study on three different continents during the two-year degree program. Since 2008, the GSP also offers a PhD program in Global Studies. The Global Studies Program has received many awards, among them the BMW Group Award for Intercultural Learning in 2004 as well as being listed a Top Ten International master's degree Course in Germany by the German Academic Exchange Service (DAAD) in 2006.

In 1995, the University of Freiburg helped the Aromanian professor Vasile Barba found the European Center of Aromanian Studies (Aromanian: Tsentrul European ti Studii Armãneshti; German: Europäisches Zentrum für Aromunische Studien), specialized on Aromanian studies.

The university also supports the Institute for Russian-German Literature and Cultural Relations at the Russian State University for the Humanities as well as the Vladimir Admoni School for Doctoral Studies at the University of Latvia.

Approximately 1/6th of its students are international students. Many students at this university participate in the ERASMUS exchange program.

== Notable alumni and professors ==
Perhaps best known amongst the alumni of the university are Joseph Goebbels, Martin Heidegger, Edmund Husserl, Hannah Arendt, Paul Ehrlich, Hans Krebs, Hans Spemann, Ethel Dench Puffer Howes, and Friedrich Hayek.

Among the affiliates are numerous Nobel laureates and Leibniz Prize winners.

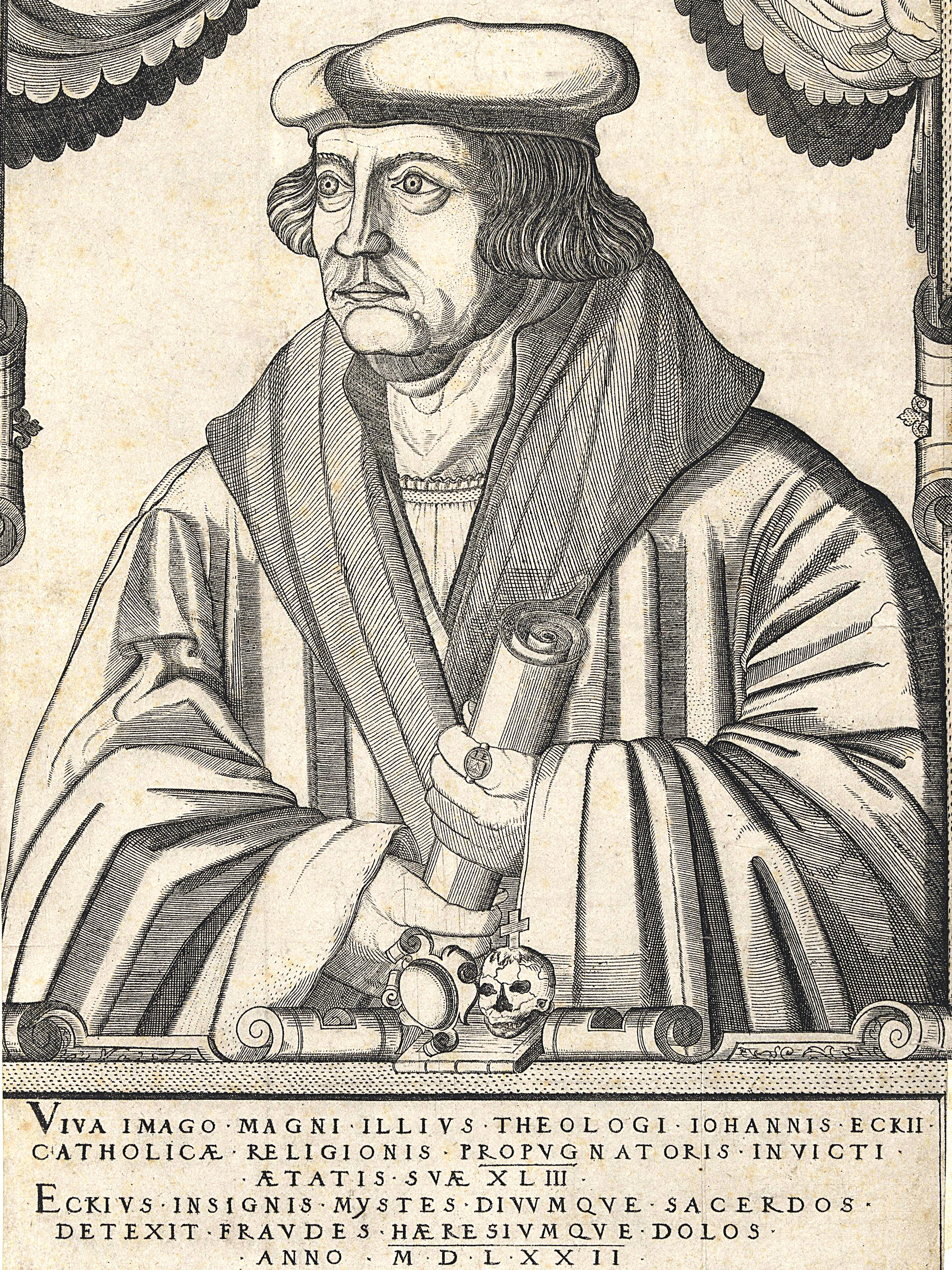
Johann Eck

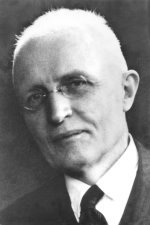
Walter Eucken

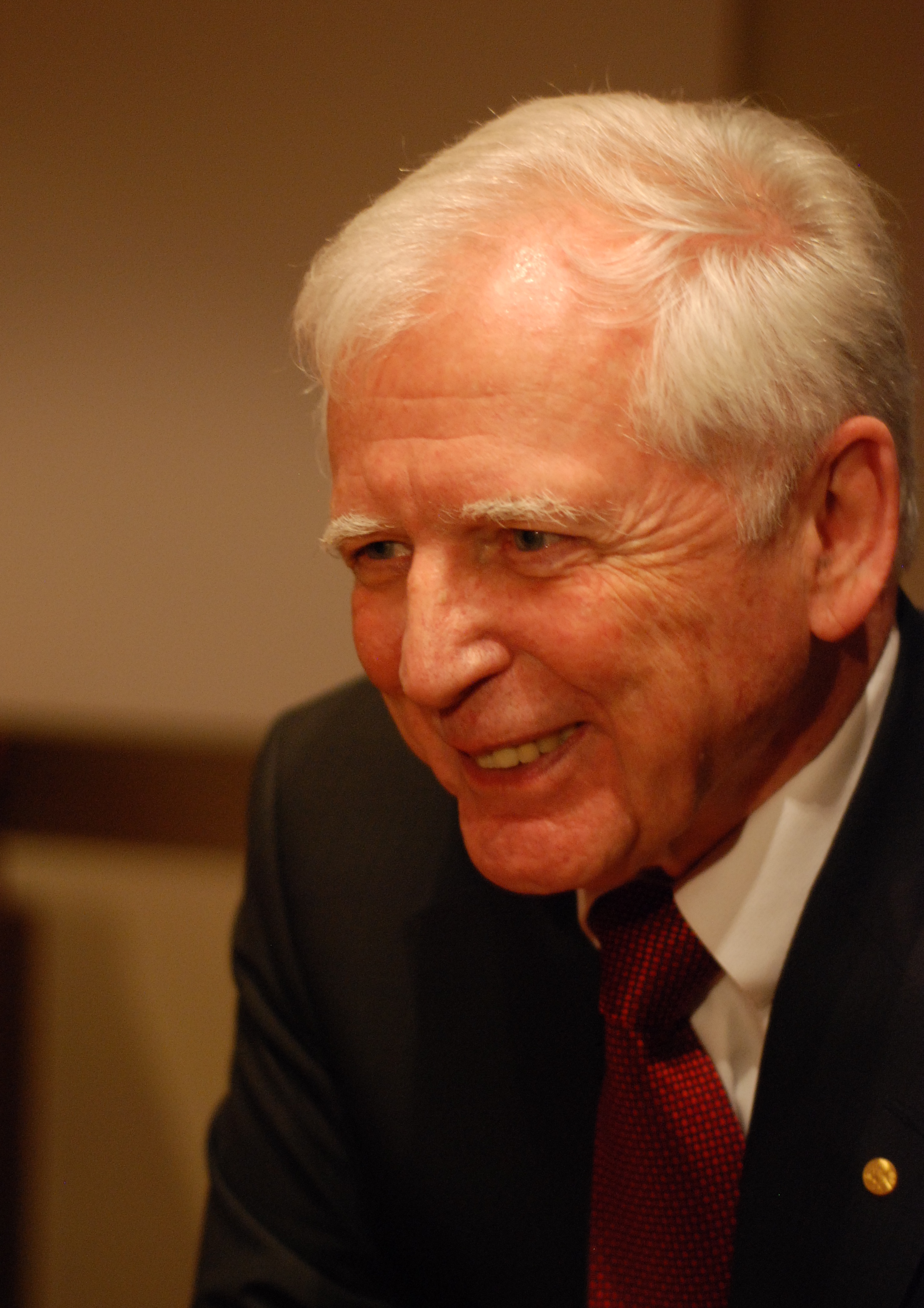
Harald zur Hausen

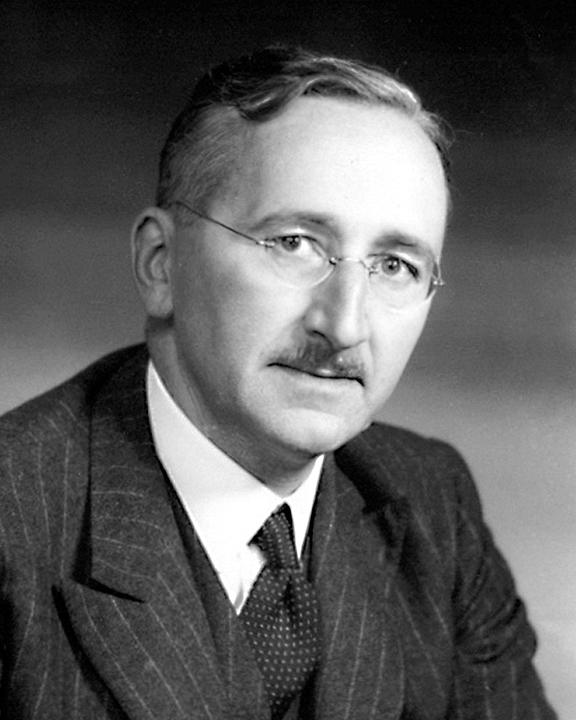
Friedrich Hayek

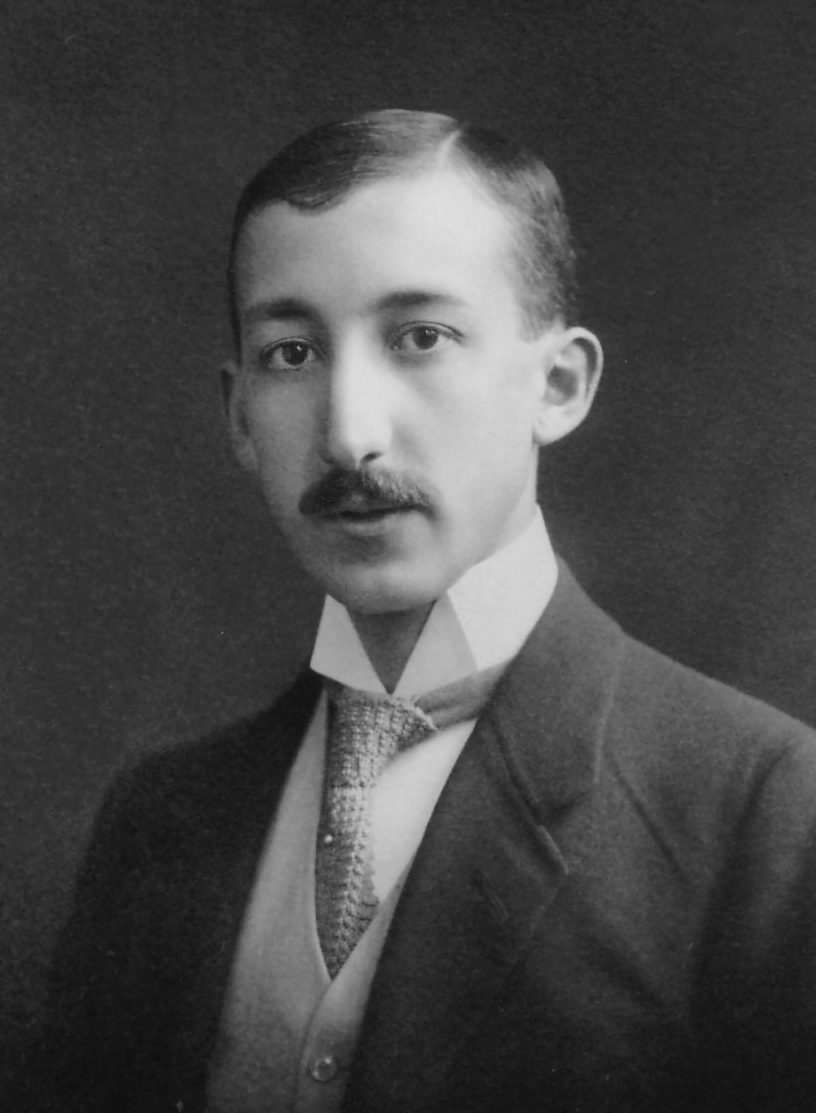
George de Hevesy

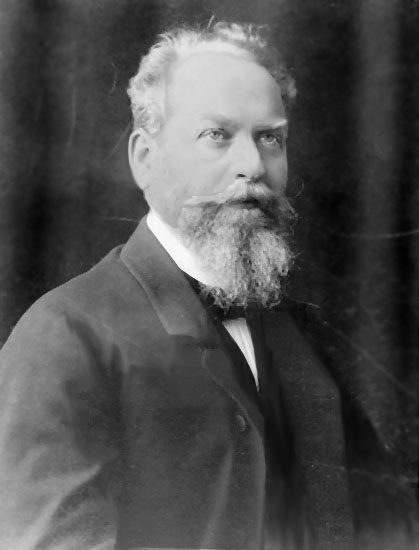
Edmund Husserl

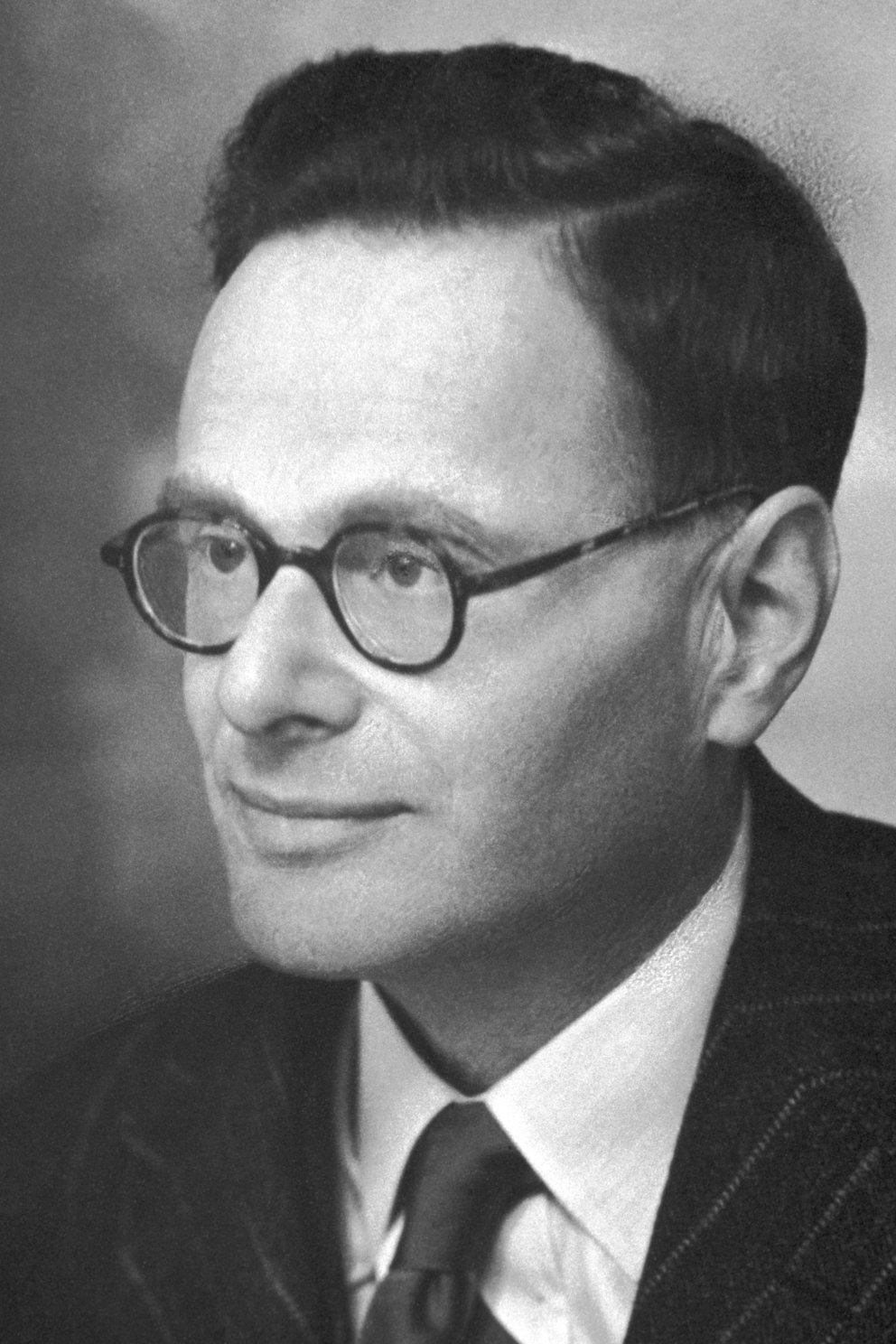
Hans Krebs

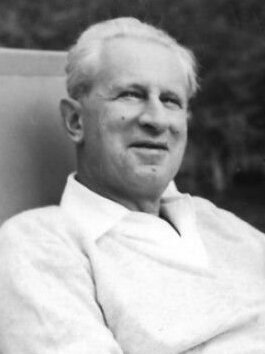
Herbert Marcuse

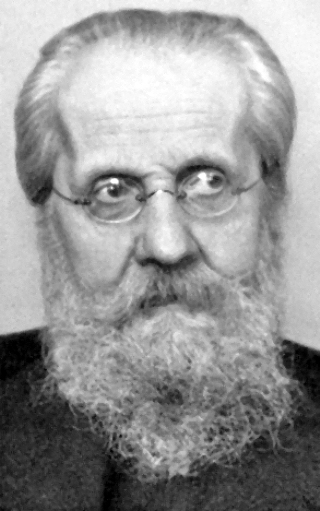
Heinrich Rickert

Rudolph Sohm

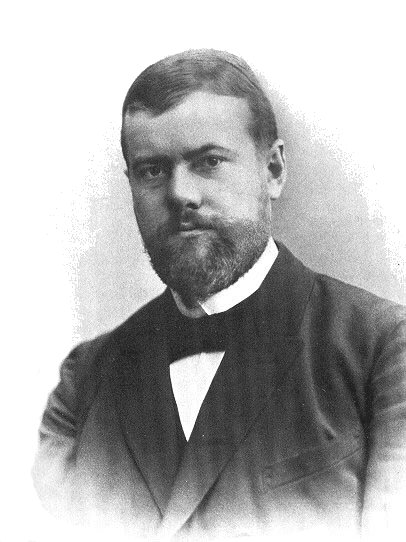
Max Weber

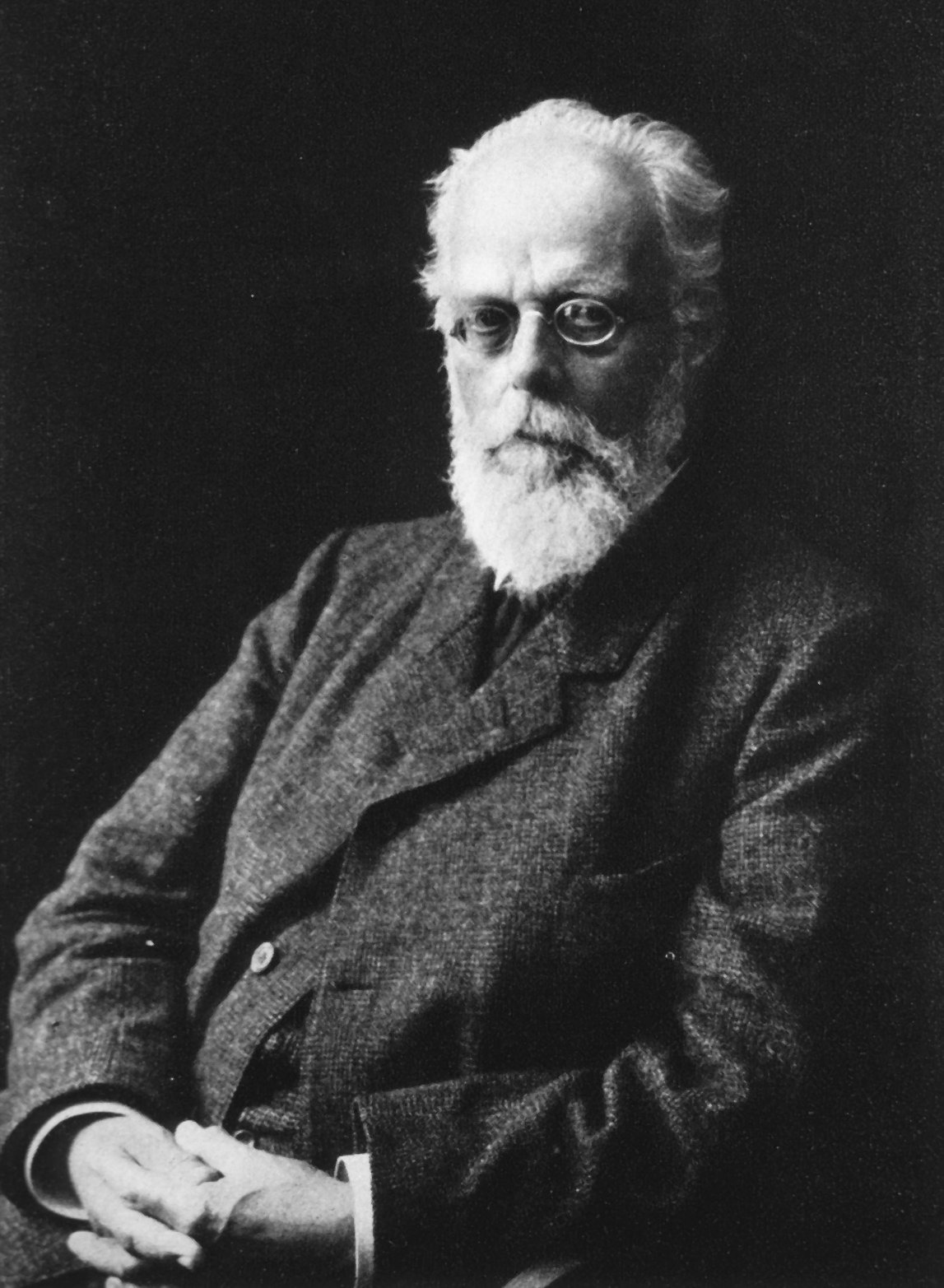
August Weismann

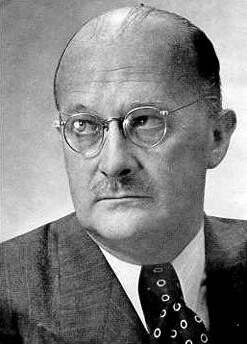
Adolf Otto Reinhold Windaus

== See also ==
- University Medical Center Freiburg
- Freiburg Institute for Advanced Studies
- University Church, Freiburg
- Freiburg School of Economic Thought
- IMTEK
- List of Jesuit sites
- List of medieval universities
- University of Freiburg Faculty of Biology
