= Crystal model =

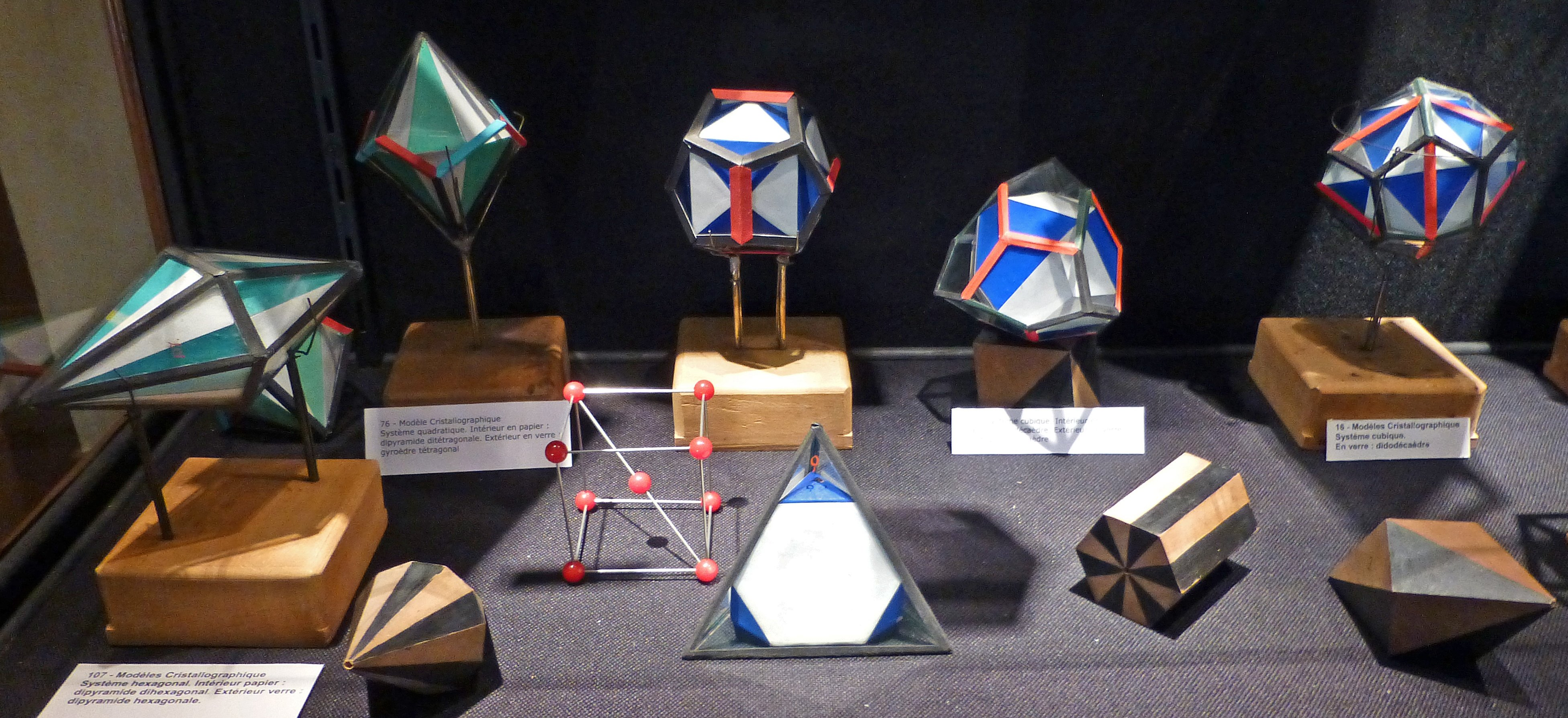
Crystal models at Musée de minéralogie

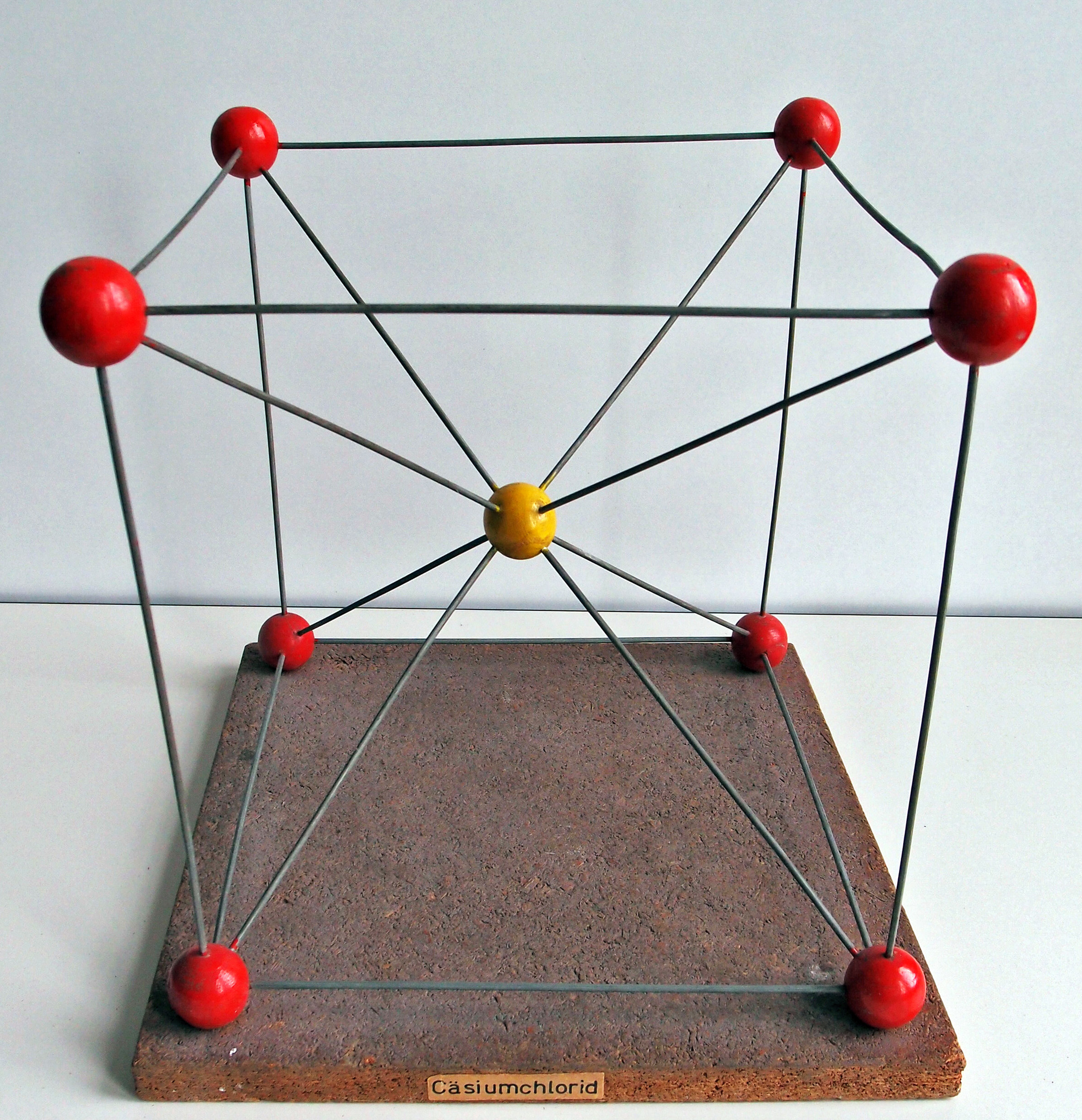
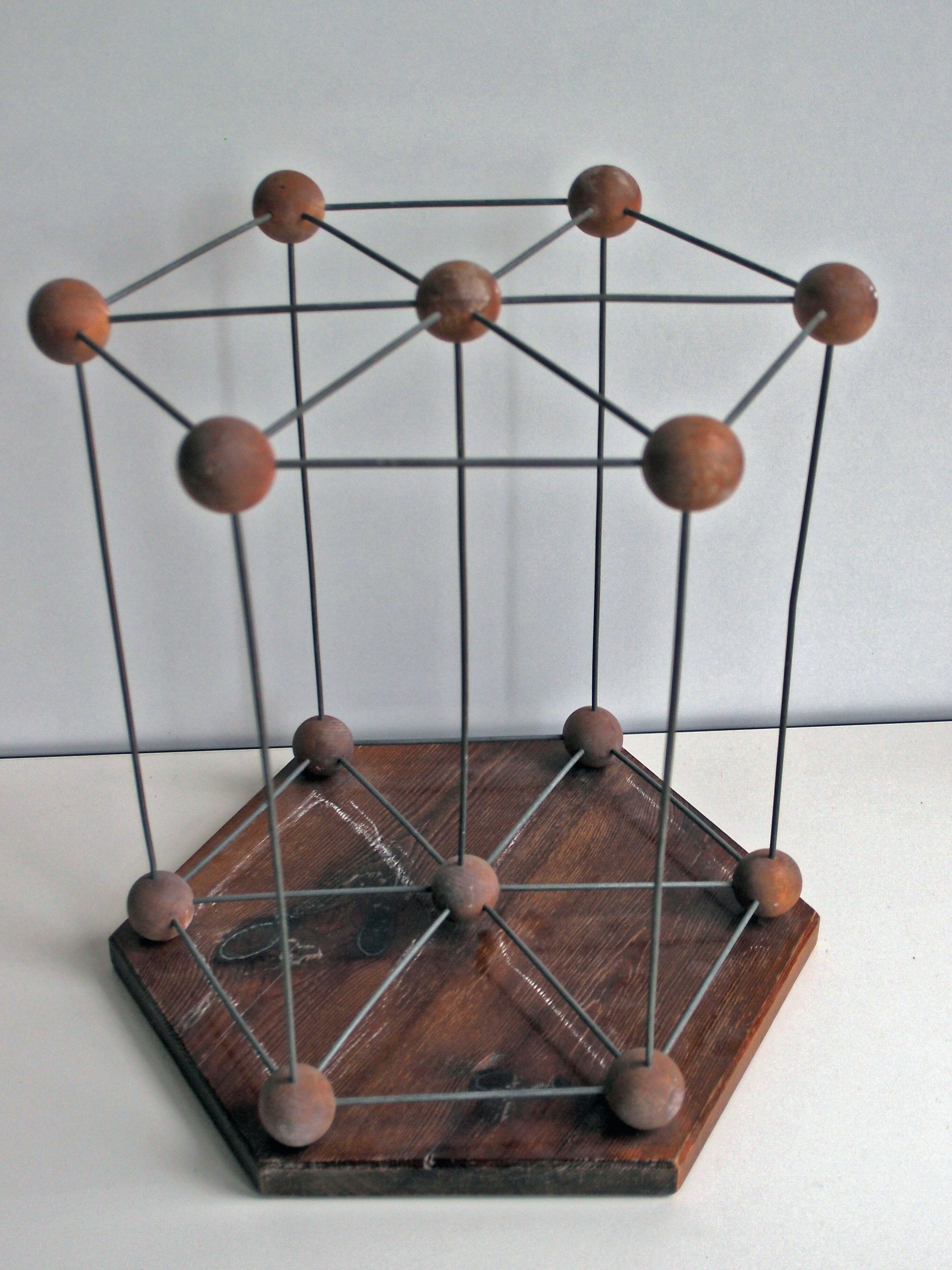
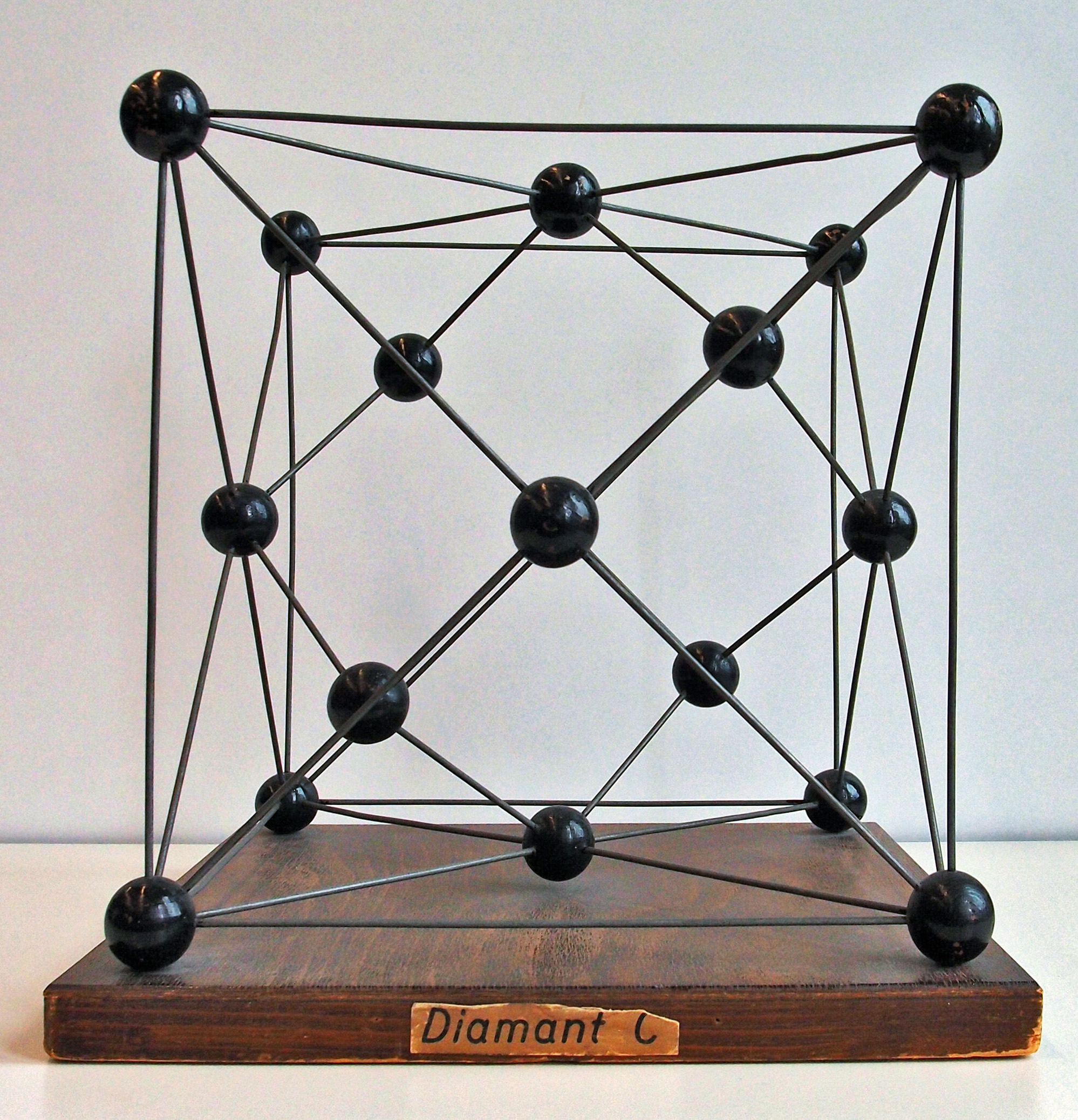
Bravais lattice models at Humboldt-Universität
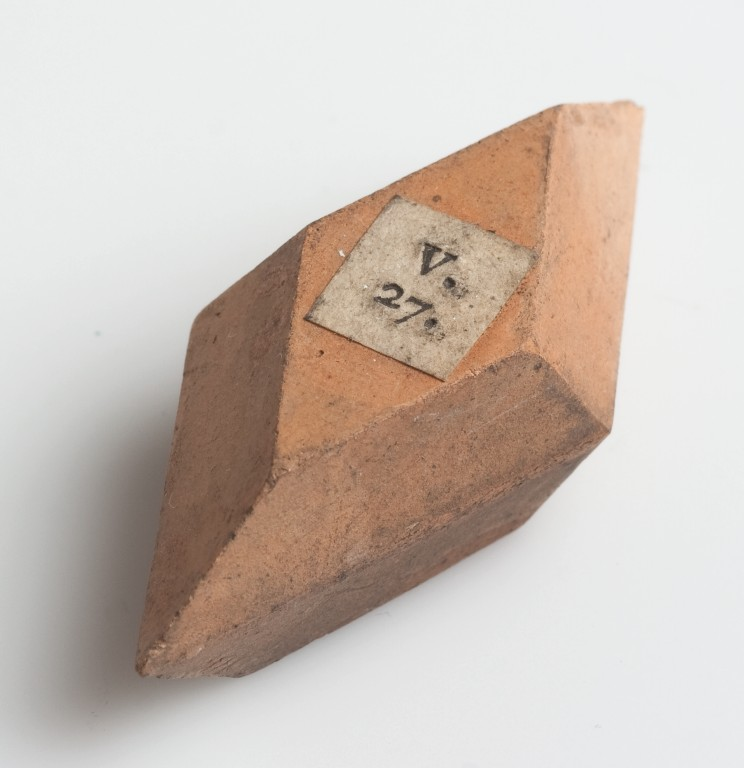
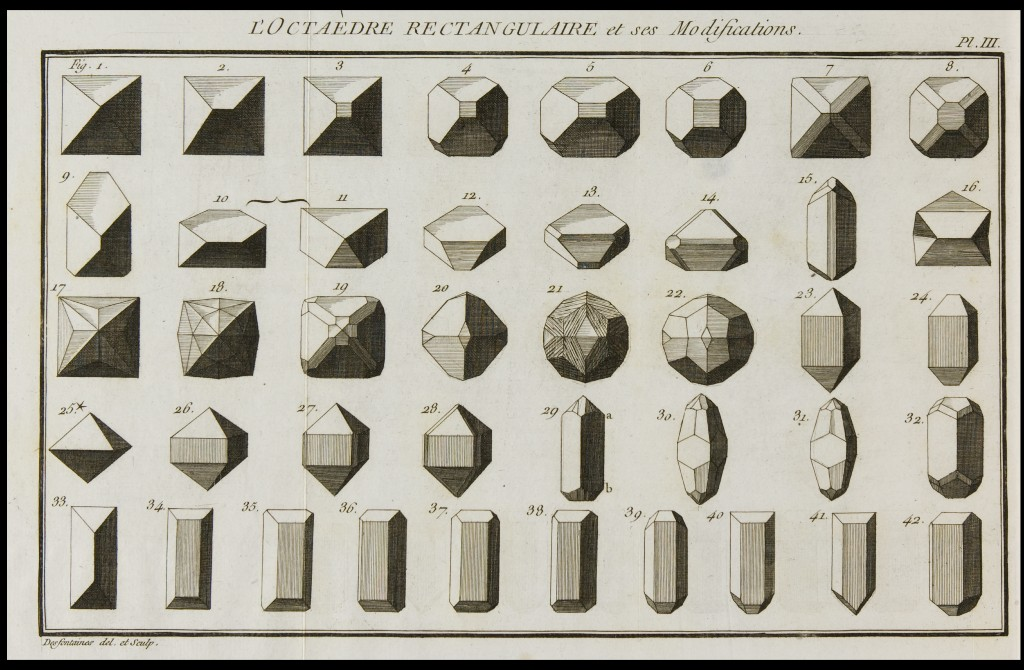
Porcelain model and engraving by Romé de l'Isle (1780s)
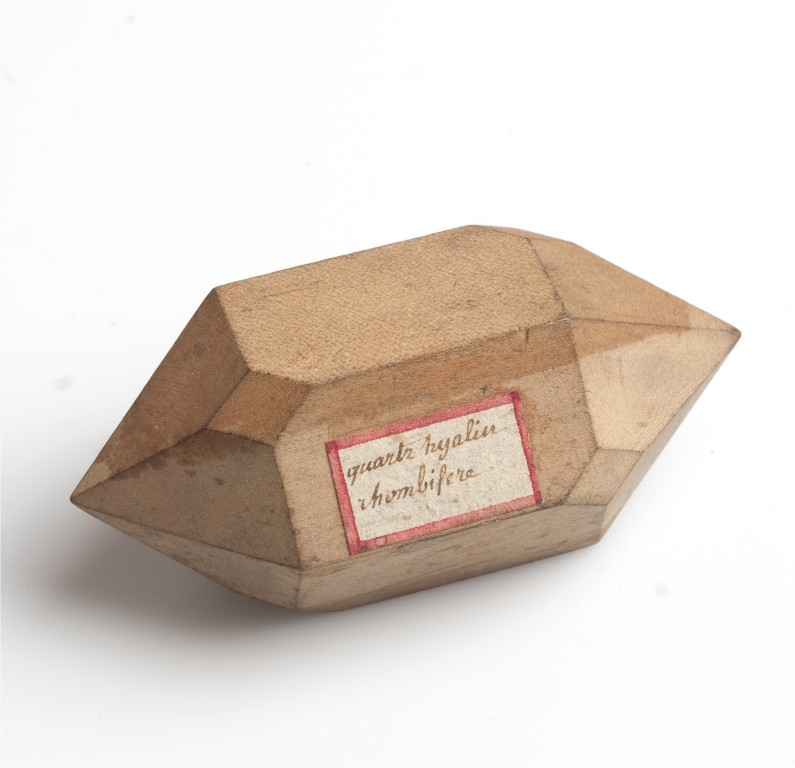
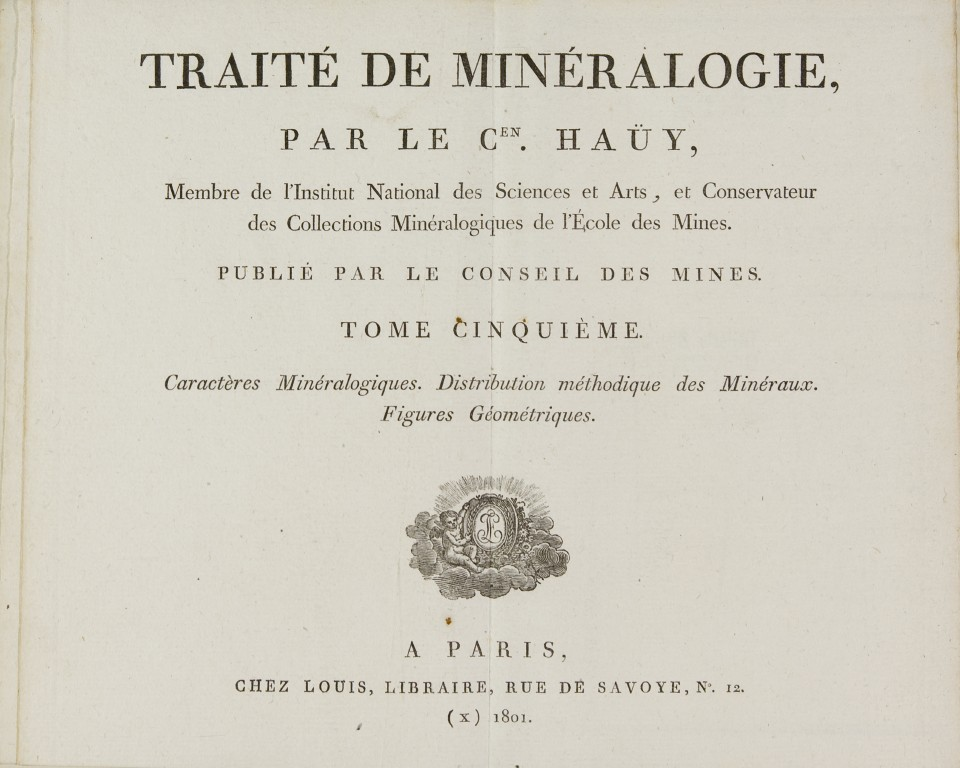
Pear wood model (Quartz hyalin rhombifère) and front page of Traité de Minéralogie (Paris 1801) by R. J. Haüy
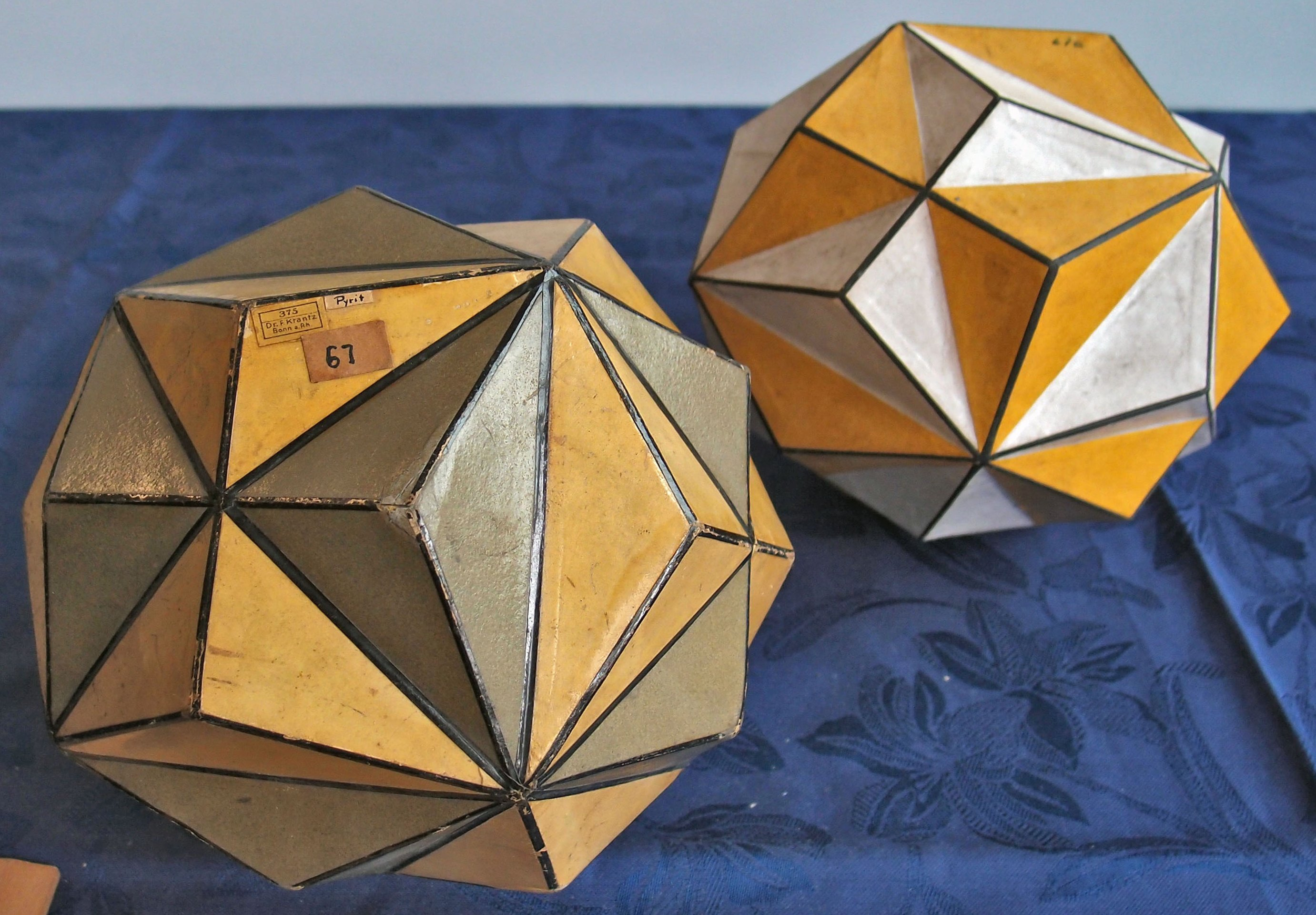
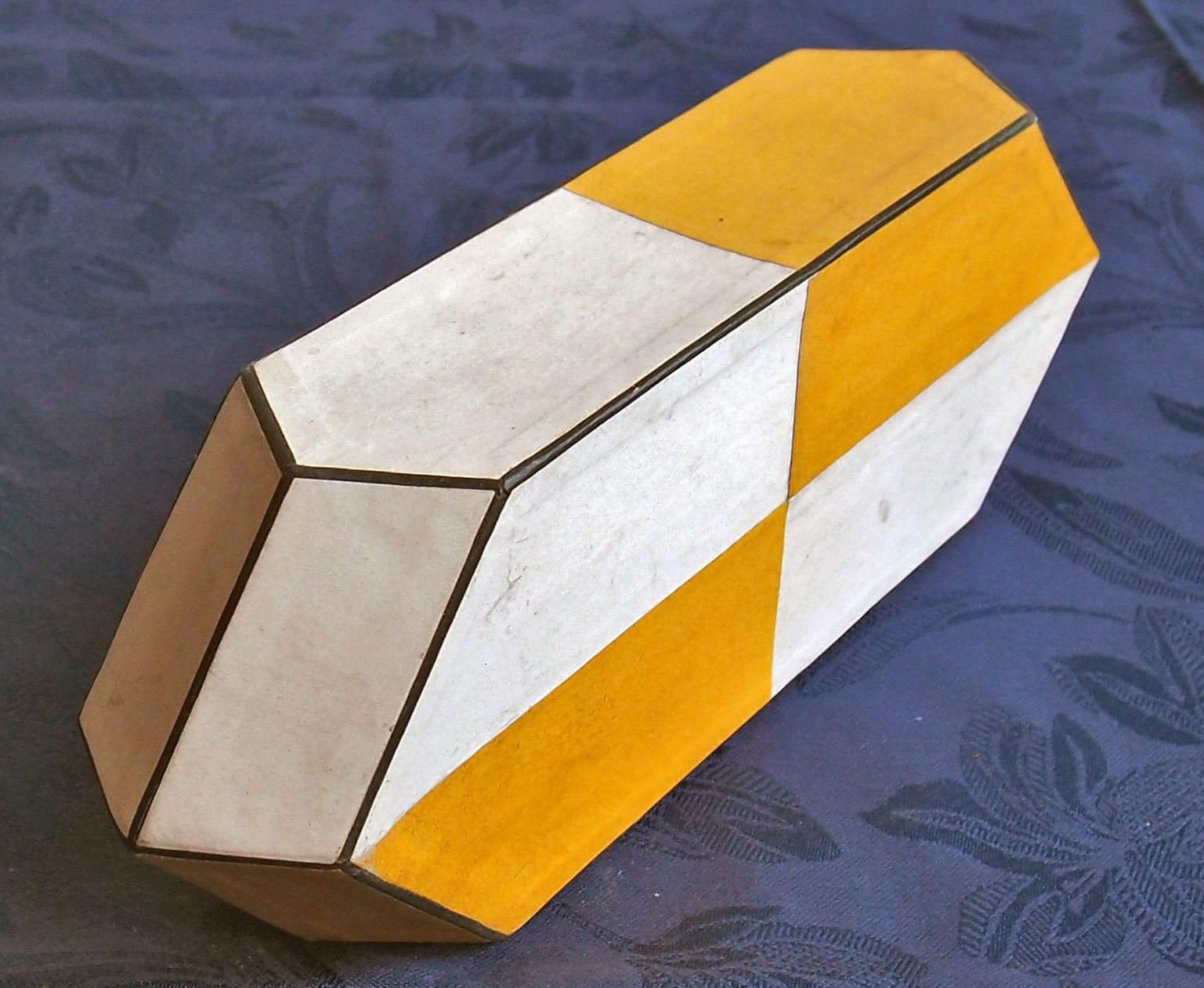
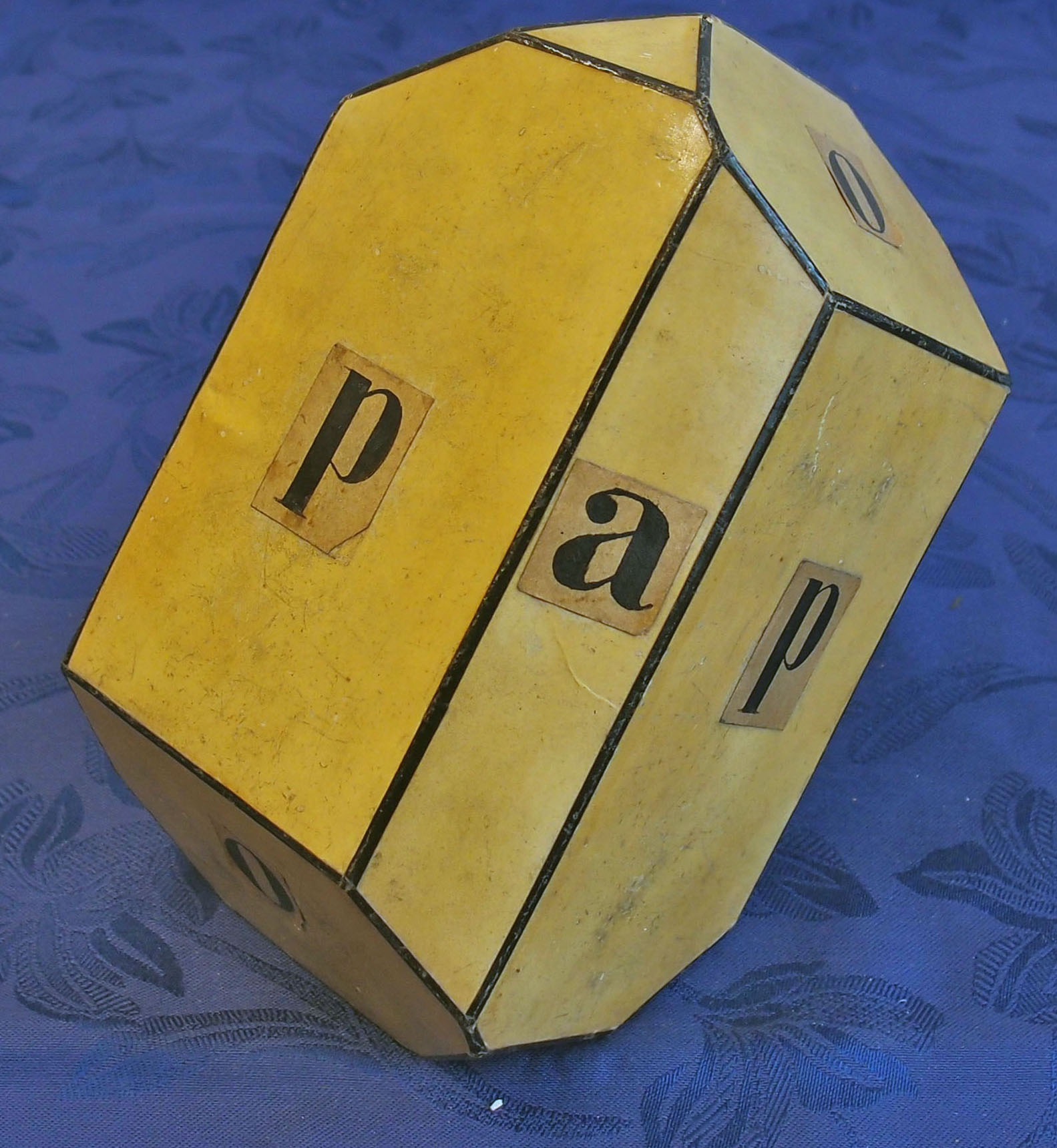
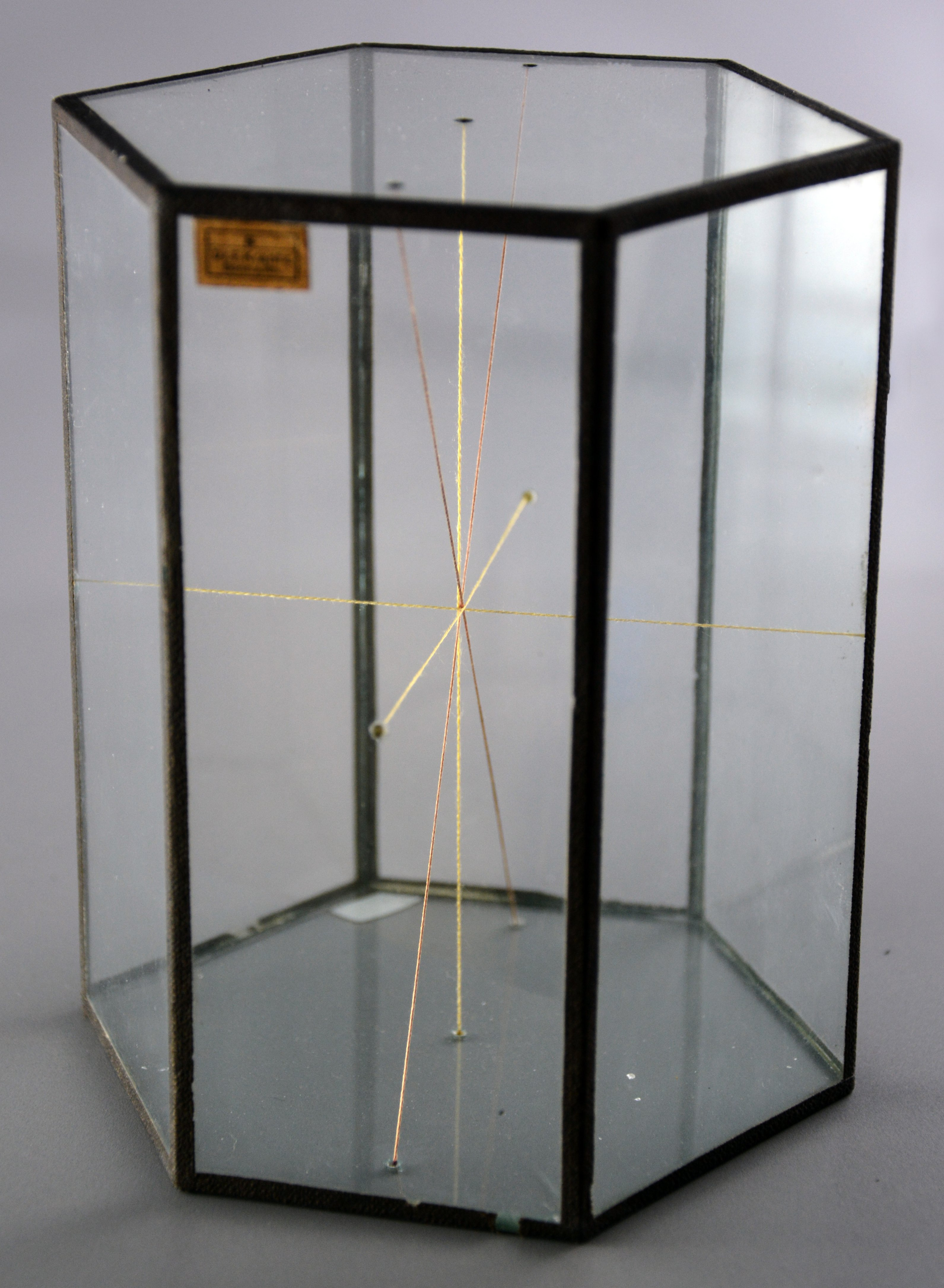
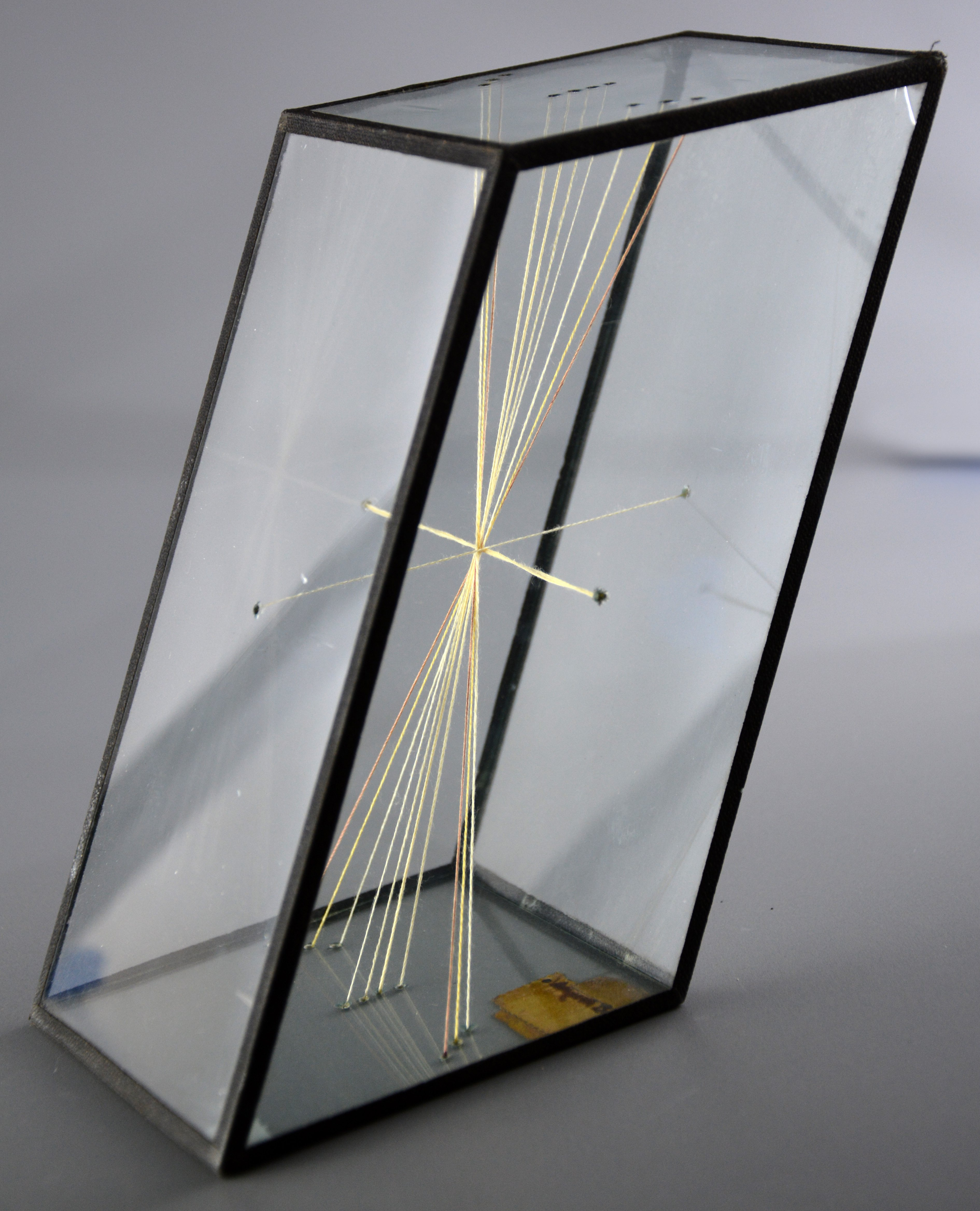
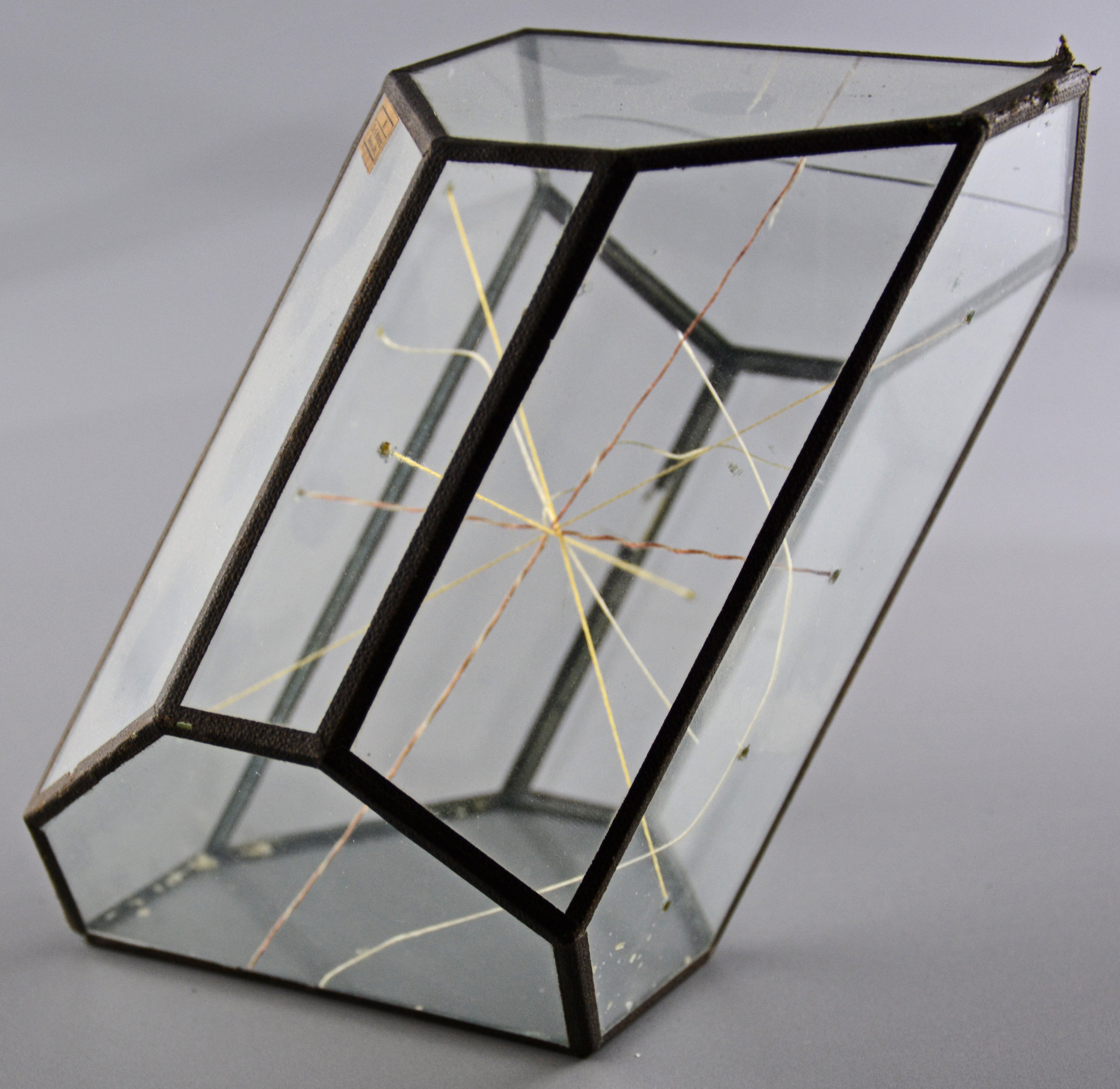
Cardboard and glass models by Dr. F. Krantz

A crystal model is a teaching aid used for understanding concepts in crystallography and the morphology of crystals. Models are ideal to learn recognizing symmetry elements in crystals.

== Romé de l'Isle ==
The first real collections of crystal models were produced by Romé de l'Isle. He actually offered sets of small (ca 3 cm) models made of "terra cotta" in order to stimulate the sales of the expensive four-volume set of his book "Cristallographie" (1783). The models were manufactured by his co-workers Arnould Carangeot, Lhermina and Swebach-Desfontaines, who produced numerous large sets (up to 448 models in each set). In order to exactly transfer interplanar angles from natural crystals to the terra cotta models, Carangeot invented and designed a prototype of a contact goniometer. This instrument, that proved to be an invaluable tool in geometric crystallography, enabled the measurement of interplanar angles with a precision of about half a degree. Teylers Museum in Haarlem has a complete set of these terracotta models that were bought in Paris (in 1785) by Martin van Marum, the first director of the museum. After over 200 years, this collection is still complete and in perfect condition at Teylers Museum.

== René Just Haüy ==
Almost two decades later, René Just Haüy introduced wooden crystal models to illustrate the two-dimensional drawings in the atlas volume of his "Traité de Minéralogie" (1801). For the production of crystal models, wood appeared to be much more convenient than clay. Especially pear wood permitted getting smooth faces, sharp edges and accurate dihedral angles required for the production of these three-dimensional objects. In general, the angular accuracy was very high and some models, especially those illustrating crystal twins and Haüy's figures of decrement, still appear as masterpieces of fine woodwork and carving. Skilful craftsmen such as Pleuvin, Beloeuf and Lambotin (to name only a few) became specialists in this field and the models they offered were highly esteemed.

Between 1802 and 1804, Martin van Marum bought 597 of these pear wood models, 550 of these are still present in the collection of Teylers Museum. Each model is labeled, mentioning a number and the name of the crystal form. This set is the most complete collection of Haüy crystal models that still survives. That Van Marum was able to acquire such a unique collection was due to his networking. Van Marum allowed Haüy as a member of the Hollandsche Maatschappij, a nomination to which Haüy attached great value. Haüy mentioned this membership in all of his publications.

After their introduction by Romé de l'Isle and Haüy, crystal models were increasingly demanded both by scholars for teaching purposes as well as by mineral collectors. The quality of the models improved due to the technical progress in their production. Several mineralogists and crystallographers started designing their own series of models. Although pear wood kept a prominent place, models were also manufactured using materials like plaster, cast iron, lead, brass, glass, porcelain, cardboard, etc.

== The Krantz Company ==
In 1833, Adam August Krantz (who studied pharmacy and later "Geognosie" at the Bergakademie Freiberg) founded the Krantz company in Bonn. Four years later, Krantz moved to Berlin and sold minerals, fossils, rocks and basically acquired a monopoly in the production of crystal models made of pear wood or walnut. Ever since its foundation, the firm was always in contact with renowned scientists and important collectors. Hence in 1880, Krantz proposed a series of 743 pear wood models compiled for teaching purposes by the crystallographer Paul Groth. Seven years later, a supplementary collection of 213 models was available.

At the onset of the 20th century, Friedrich Krantz (a nephew of August Krantz, with a degree in mineralogy) supported by his teacher the crystallographer Carl Hintze, offered a collection of 928 models including most of the Groth models. Later, and along with many other productions, a Dana collection of 282 models was manufactured. Krantz offered a choice of collections of wooden models in different sizes (5, 10, 15–25 cm). In addition, he sold a variety of glass models having the crystallographic axes illustrated by colored silk threads or with the holohedral form made of cardboard inside. Also available were models in massive cut and polished glass (colored and uncolored), cardboard models, wire crystal models, crystal lattice models, models with rotating parts, etc. Over the years, Krantz published numerous detailed catalogues of the collections he offered; they constitute a precious documentation.

== See also ==
- History of crystallography before X-rays
