= University of Strasbourg =

Public university in France

Coordinates: 48°34′49″N 7°45′52″E

- Université de Strasbourg
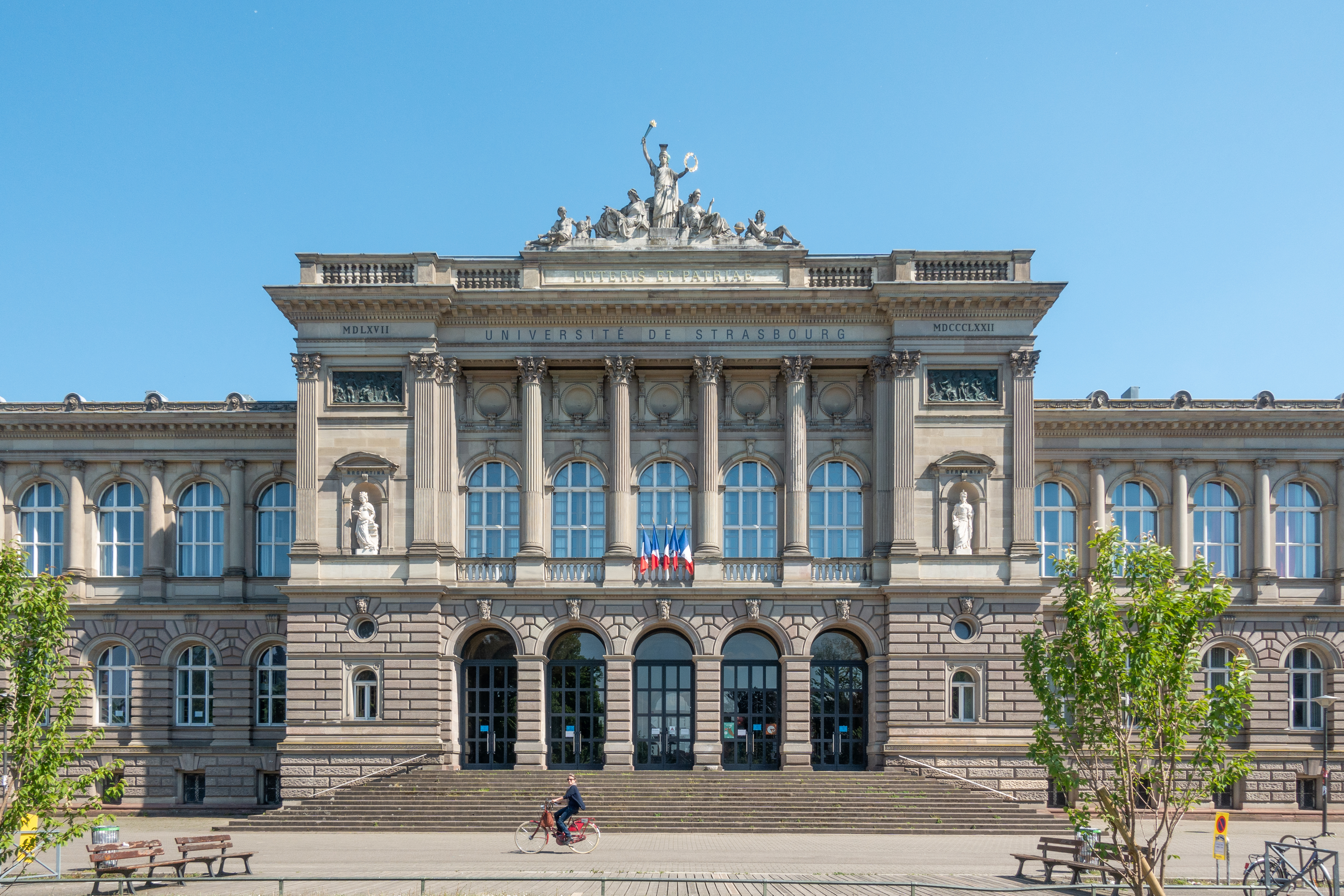
- Palais Universitaire, main building of the former Imperial University of Strasbourg
- Type: Public research university
- Established: 1538; 488 years ago
- Founder: Johannes Sturm
- Affiliations: Udice Group, LERU, Utrecht Network; AACSB, EFMD, EUCOR
- Budget: €581 million (2024)
- President: Frédérique Berrod
- Students: 55004
- Doctoral students: 1931 (2023)
- Location: Strasbourg, Grand Est, France
- Website: www.unistra.fr

The University of Strasbourg (French: Université de Strasbourg, Unistra) is a public research university located in Strasbourg, France, with over 52000 students and 3300 researchers. Founded in the 16th century by Johannes Sturm, it was a center of intellectual life during the Age of Enlightenment.

In the 1970s, the old university was reorganized into three distinct institutions, which were consolidated in 2009. The current University of Strasbourg comprises 35 academic faculties, schools, and institutes, as well as 71 research laboratories spread across six campuses, including the historic site in the Neustadt.

Throughout its existence, Unistra alumni, faculty, or researchers have included 18 Nobel laureates, two Fields Medalists and a wide range of notable individuals in their respective fields. Among them are Goethe, statesman Robert Schuman, historian Marc Bloch and several chemists such as Louis Pasteur.

== History ==
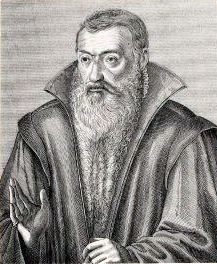
Johannes Sturm, founder of the university (1539)

The university emerged from the Jean Sturm Gymnasium, a gymnasium of Lutheran and humanist inspiration, founded in 1538 by Johannes Sturm in the Free Imperial City of Straßburg. It became a university in 1621 (German: Universität Straßburg) and a royal university in 1631. Among its earliest university students was Johann Scheffler (1624-1677), who studied medicine and later converted to Catholicism and became the mystic and poet Angelus Silesius.

The Lutheran German university continued its activities after the annexation of the city by the French King Louis XIV in 1681 (one famous student was Johann Wolfgang von Goethe in 1770/71), but mainly turned into a collection of French-speaking academies following the French Revolution at the end of the 18th century.

After the Franco-Prussian War of 1870 to 1871 and the annexation of Alsace-Lorraine to Germany provoked a westwards exodus of Francophone teachers, German nationalists in the Second Reich re-founded the university as the Kaiser-Wilhelm-Universität in 1872. During the German Empire the university greatly expanded and numerous new buildings were erected: the university was intended to be a showcase of German against French culture in Alsace. In 1918, Alsace-Lorraine was returned to France, so a reverse exodus of Germanophone teachers took place.

During the Second World War the Axis powers occupied France from 1940 to 1945; personnel and equipment of the University of Strasbourg largely migrated to Clermont-Ferrand in 1939. Nazi Germany re-annexed Alsace in June 1940 and founded the short-lived German Reichsuniversität Straßburg in November 1941. From 1945 the French university resumed activity in Strasbourg.

In 1971, the French Ministry of National Education implemented the loi Faure and subdivided the university into three separate institutions:

- Louis Pasteur University (Strasbourg I)
- Marc Bloch University (Strasbourg II)
- Robert Schuman University (Strasbourg III)

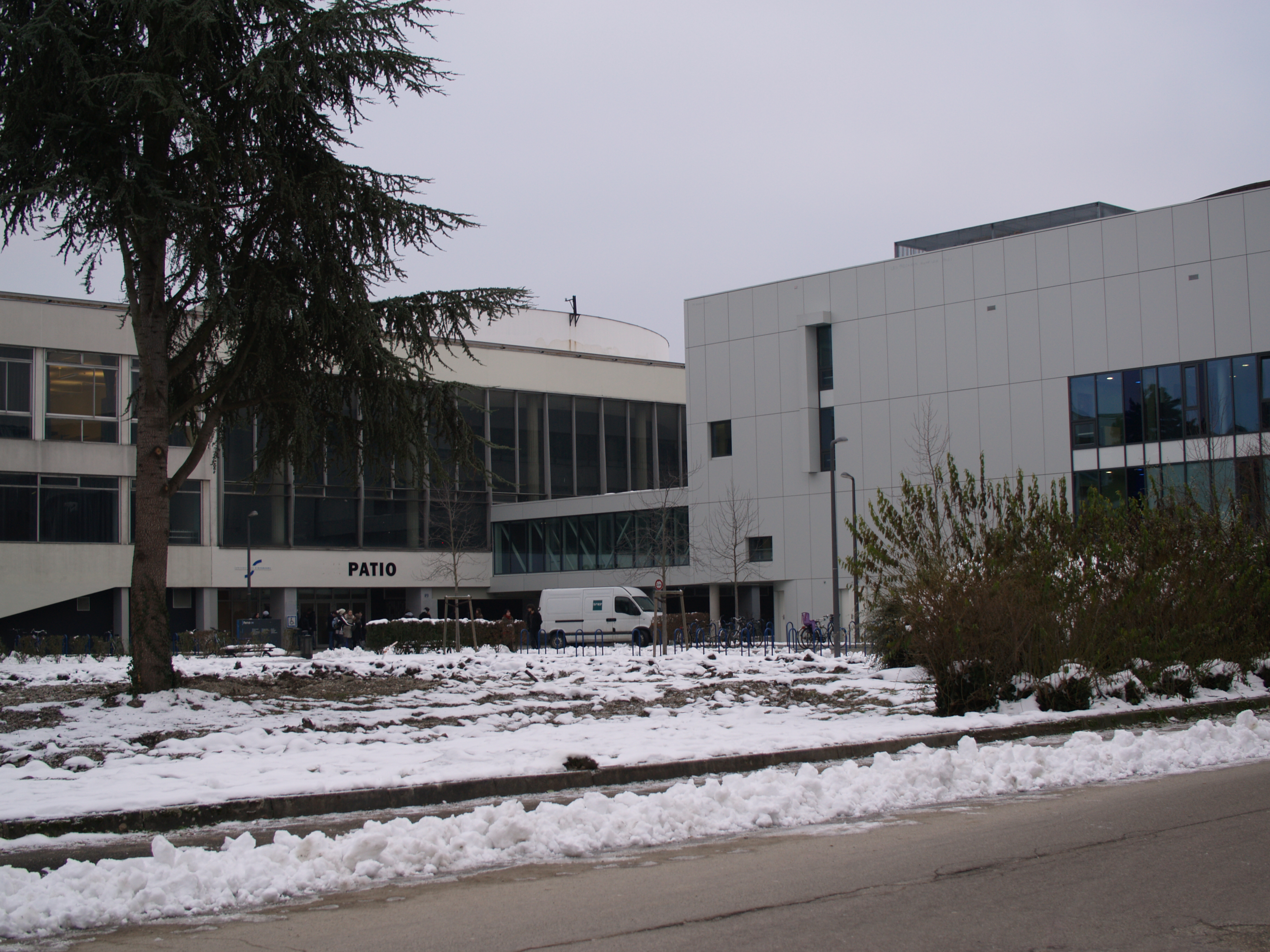
The new Patio, seat of the university administration, inaugurated in 2010.

Following a national reform of higher education, these universities re-merged on 1 January 2009, and the new institution became one of the first French universities to benefit from greater autonomy. To strengthen this merger and secure funding for a more unified campus, the three predecessor institutions successfully applied for the national "Plan Campus" initiative, being selected in May 2008 to receive state capital of 375 million euros supplemented by local government contributions. Officially launched in February 2009 by Minister Valérie Pécresse and President Alain Beretz, this reorganization focused on the historic Esplanade campus and included the 2010 inauguration of the "Nouveau Patio," a central administrative hub consolidating services previously scattered across the city. Simultaneously, the university's foundation launched France's first major private fundraising campaign on 1 October 2010, under the patronage of Jean-Claude Juncker and Henri Lachmann, successfully securing millions in pledges from companies like AXA and Soprema to bolster research and interdisciplinary projects. Further development followed the 2009 "Investissements d'Avenir" program, which saw the creation of a University Hospital Institute (IHU) funded by 67.5 million euros in public grants and 80 million euros from private partners. In July 2011, Strasbourg became one of the first three French universities to be labeled an "Initiative of Excellence" (Idex), receiving a 750-million-euro endowment to support its "UNISTRA: Beyond Borders" project in collaboration with partners like CNRS and Inserm.

This period was mirrored by international academic recognition, as the university celebrated three Nobel Prizes within five years—Jules Hoffmann (Medicine, 2011), Martin Karplus (Chemistry, 2013), and Jean-Pierre Sauvage (Chemistry, 2016)—bringing its total number of active Nobel laureates to four, alongside Jean-Marie Lehn.

== Campuses ==
The University of Strasbourg is primarily located in Strasbourg, with its Central Campus situated in the Esplanade district. This main site features a mix of neo-renaissance German architecture—such as the Palais Universitaire, the astronomical observatory, and the botanical garden—alongside modern buildings from the 1960s expansion designed by Charles-Gustave Stoskopf.

The university also operates three specialized campuses within the Eurométropole de Strasbourg: the Cronenbourg Campus, which hosts technology institutes and CNRS laboratories; the Illkirch Campus, home to the Faculty of Pharmacy, the IGBMC, and the International Space University; and the Medicine Campus, located at the historic civil hospital site near the city center. Additional facilities are scattered throughout the region, including the INSPE sites in the Meinau district, Colmar, and Sélestat, as well as an Institute of Technology in Haguenau. The Strasbourg campuses are well-integrated into the city's infrastructure, served by multiple lines of the Strasbourg tramway and bus network.

== Buildings ==
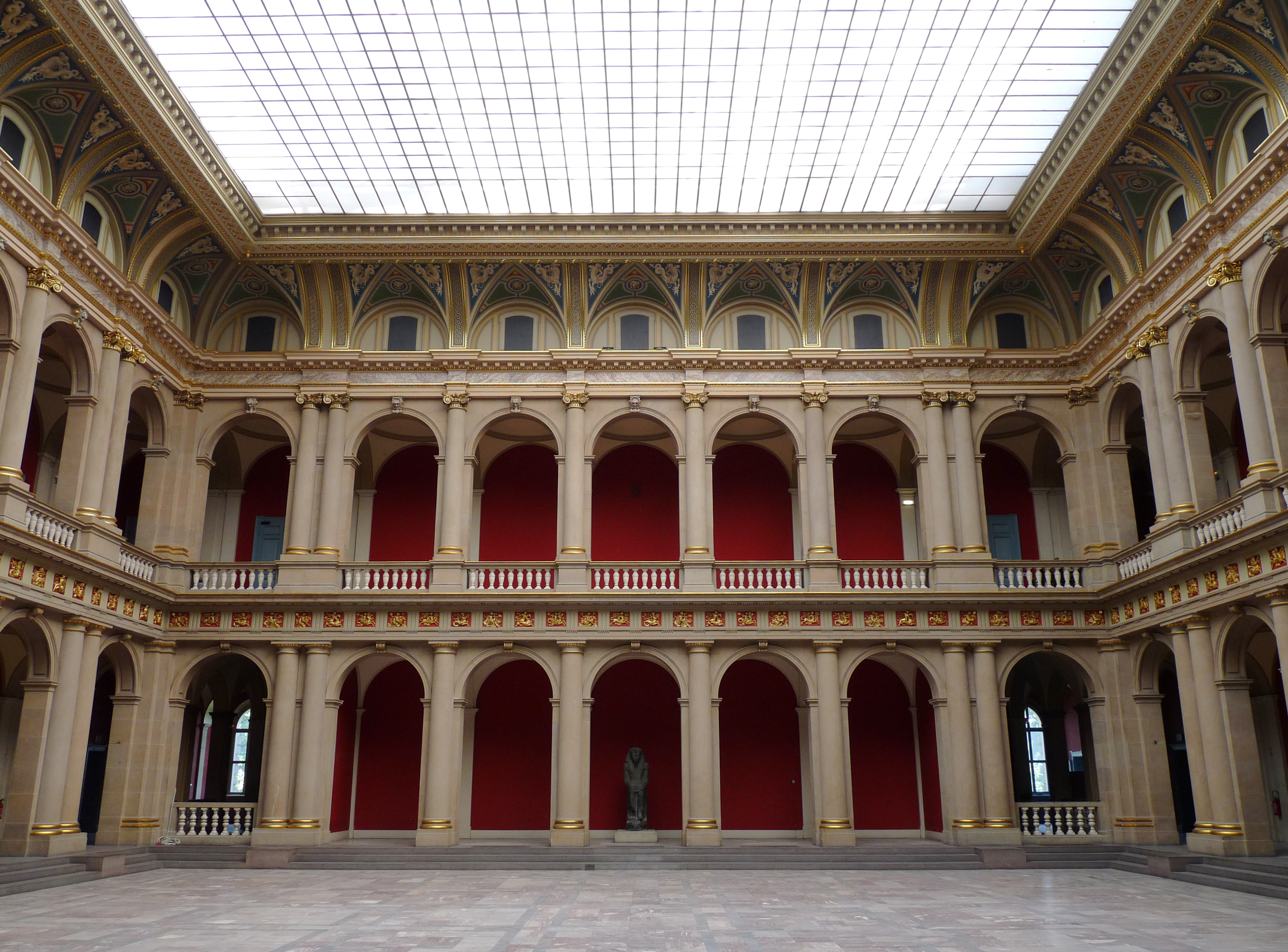
Grand hall of the University Palace, where the first session of the Council of Europe Assembly took place

The university campus covers a vast part near the center of the city, located between the "Cité Administrative", "Esplanade" and "Gallia" bus-tram stations.

Modern architectural buildings include: Escarpe, the Doctoral College of Strasbourg, Supramolecular Science and Engineering Institute (ISIS), Atrium, Pangloss, PEGE (Pôle européen de gestion et d'économie) and others. The student residence building for the Doctoral College of Strasbourg was designed by London-based Nicholas Hare Architects in 2007. The structures are depicted on the main inner wall of the Esplanade university restaurant, accompanied by the names of their architects and years of establishment.

The administrative organisms, attached to the university (Prefecture; CAF, LMDE, MGEL—health insurance; SNCF—national French railway company; CTS—Strasbourg urban transportation company), are located in the "Agora" building.

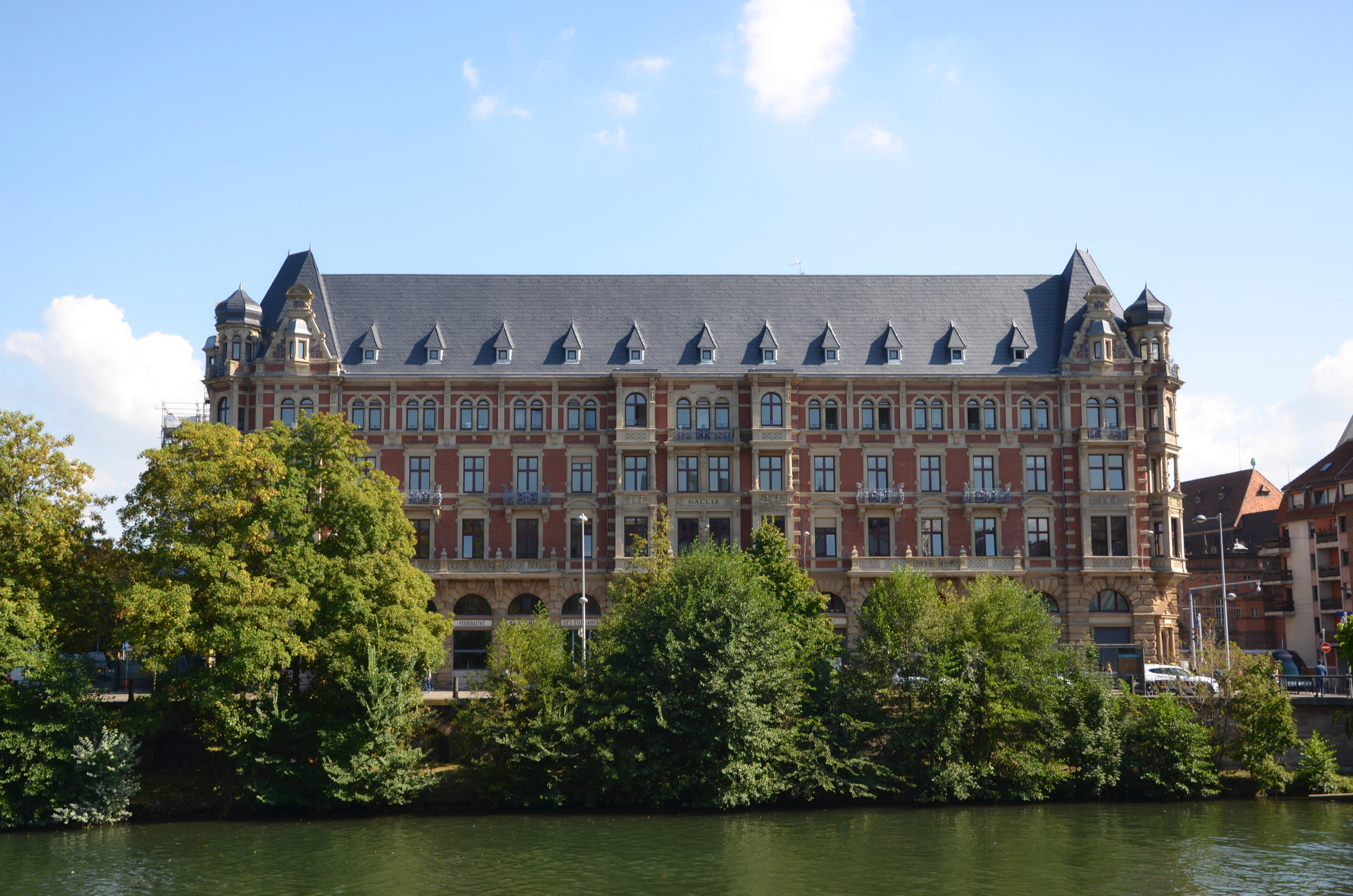
The Gallia building, formerly Germania, seat of the Regional Student's Service Centre

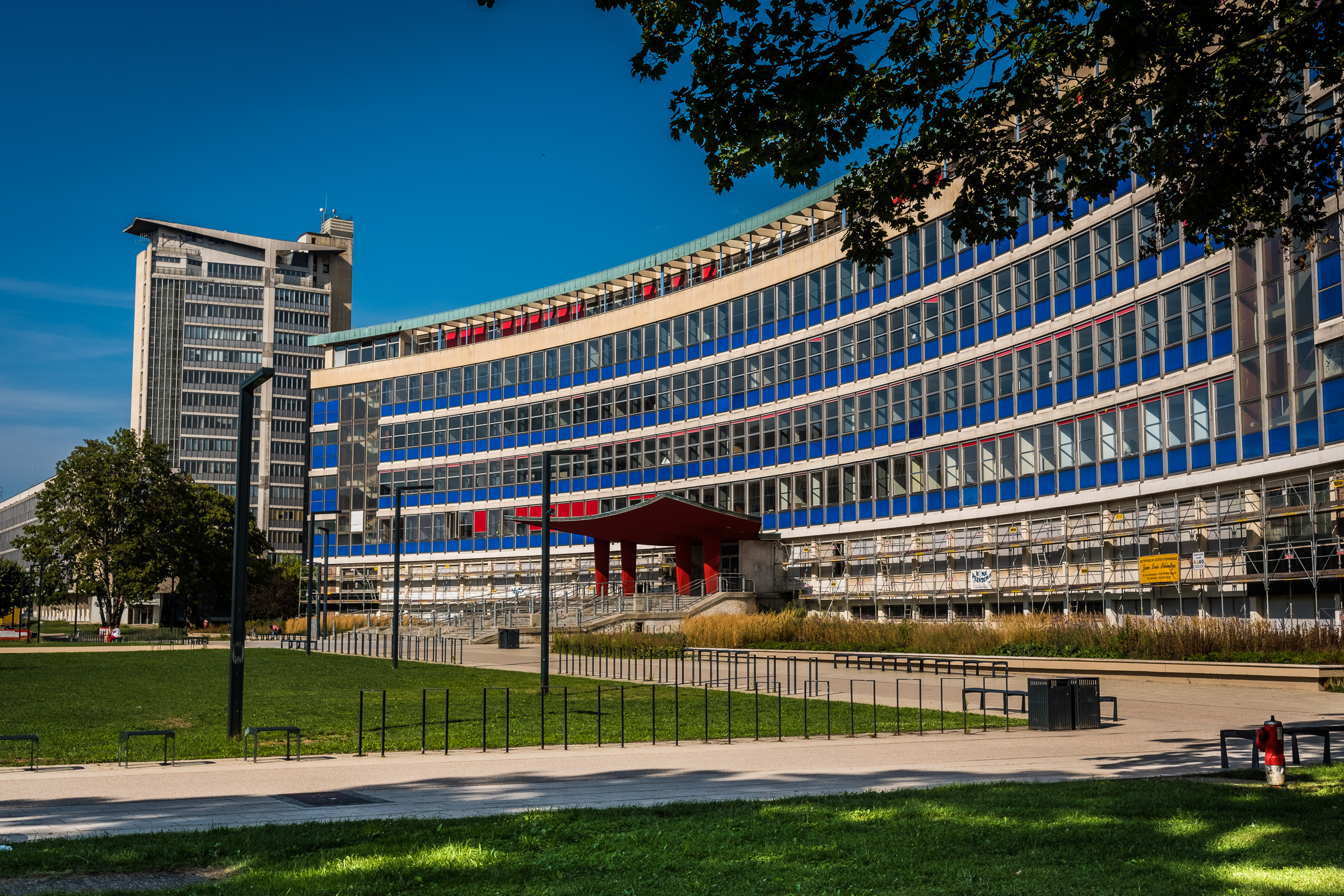
Main Law faculty building of the former Robert Schuman University

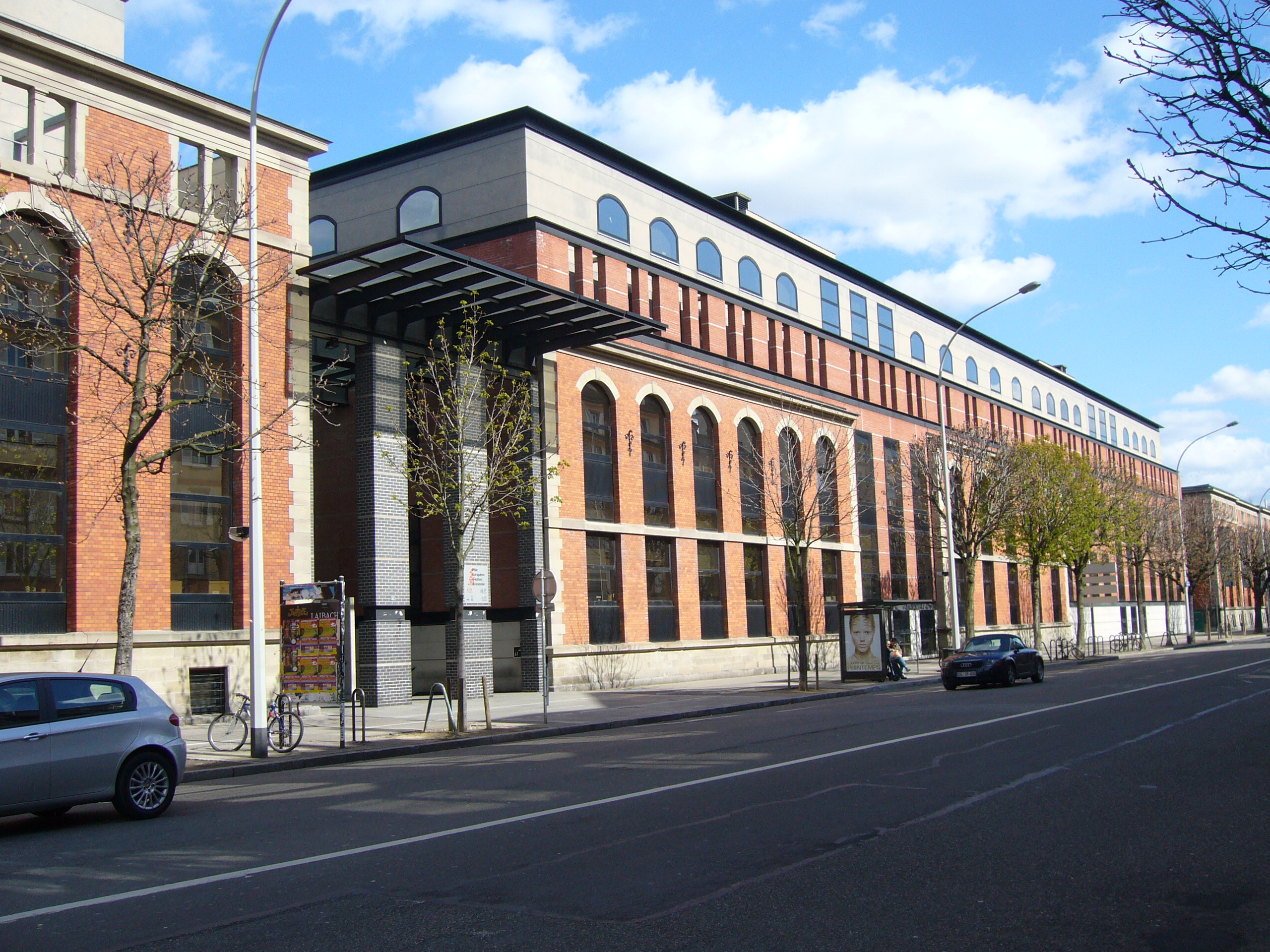
Main building of the university for economic and management studies (AKA : PEGE - Pôle Européen de gestion et d'économie)

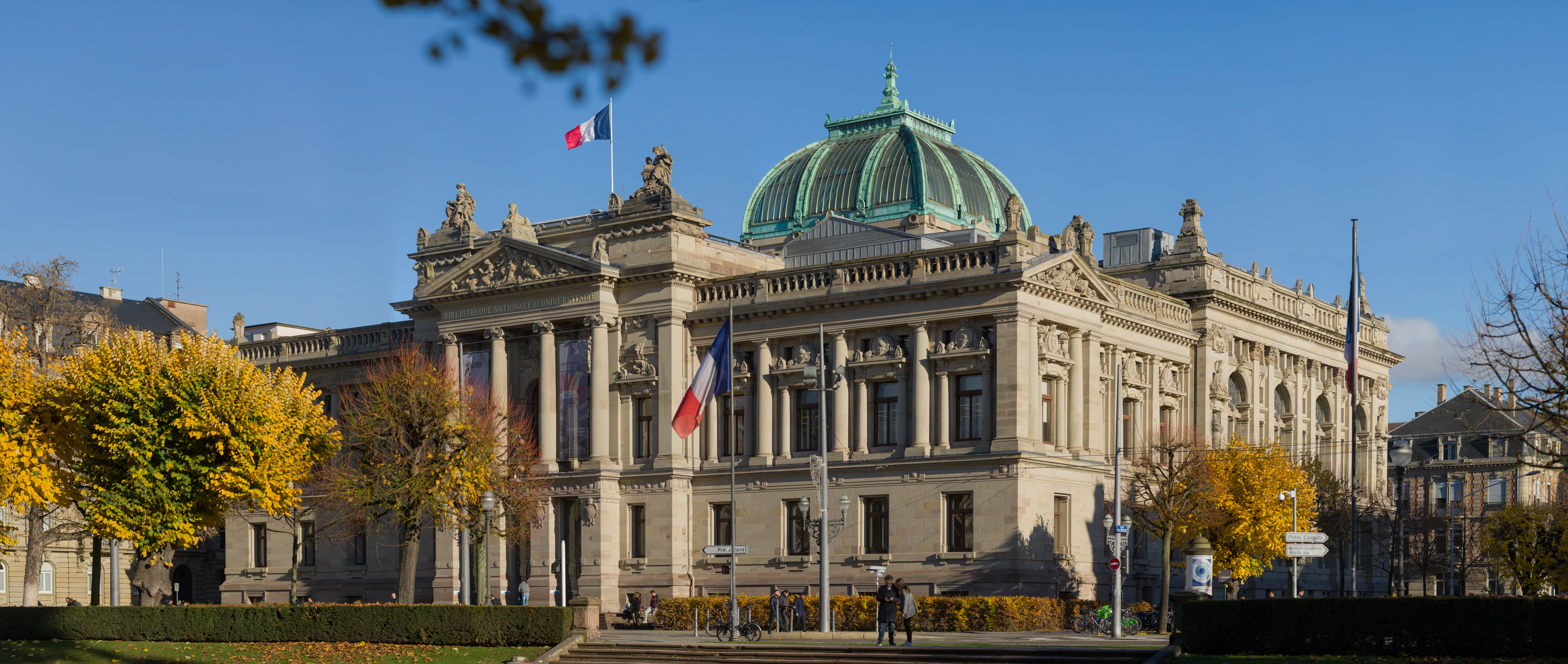
The National and University Library on Place de la République, former Kaiserplatz

== International partnerships ==
The University of Strasbourg is a member of several European networks focused on research, student exchange, and the establishment of joint degrees:

- Eucor – The European Campus, created in 1989 at the initiative of the University of Basel, which brings together the universities of the Upper Rhine region, namely the Karlsruhe Institute of Technology, the University of Basel, the University of Freiburg, the University of Upper Alsace and the University of Strasbourg, these universities possessing numerous links due to their history and geographical proximity.
- League of European Research Universities (LERU) which brings together twenty-two of the most renowned universities in Europe and of which it is one of the founding members.
- EUniverCities network, aimed at promoting exchanges between universities in medium-sized cities, to foster the visibility of the university as a place of knowledge and innovation in the city.
- Utrecht Network which is a grouping of inter-university cooperation in Europe promoting, among other things, student exchange, joint degrees and research cooperation.

== Nobel laureates ==
- Adolf von Baeyer
- Karl Ferdinand Braun
- Paul Ehrlich
- Hermann Emil Fischer
- Jules Hoffmann
- Albrecht Kossel
- Martin Karplus
- Max von Laue
- Charles Louis Alphonse Laveran
- Jean-Marie Lehn
- Otto Loewi
- Otto Fritz Meyerhof
- Louis Néel
- Wilhelm Röntgen
- Jean-Pierre Sauvage
- Albert Schweitzer
- Hermann Staudinger
- Pieter Zeeman

== Notable people ==
- Johannes Sturm (1507–1589)
- Johannes Nicolaus Furichius (1602–1633)
- Johann Conrad Dannhauer (1603–1666)
- Angelus Silesius (Johann Scheffler) (1624–1677)
- Philipp Jacob Spener (1635–1705)
- Antoine Deparcieux (1703–1768)
- Johann Hermann (1738–1800)
- Mikhail Illarionovich Kutuzov (1745–1813)
- Johann Peter Frank (1745–1821)
- Dominique Villars (1745–1841)
- Johann Wolfgang von Goethe (1749–1832)
- Louis Ramond de Carbonnières (1755–1827)
- Maximilian von Montgelas (1759–1838)
- Klemens Wenzel von Metternich (1773–1859)
- Jean Lobstein (1777–1835)
- Georg Büchner (1813–1837)
- Charles Frédéric Gerhardt (1816–1856)
- Emil Kopp (1817–1875)
- Charles-Adolphe Wurtz (1817–1884)
- Auguste Nefftzer (1820–1876)
- August Kayser (*1821–1885)
- Louis Pasteur (1822–1895)
- Adolph Kussmaul (1822–1902)
- Ambroise-Auguste Liébeault (1823–1904)
- Georg Albert Lücke (1829–1894)
- Paul Schützenberger (1829–1897)
- Anton de Bary (1831–1888)
- Friedrich Daniel von Recklinghausen (1833–1910)
- Georg Gerland (1833–1919)
- Adolf von Baeyer (1835–1917), Nobel Prize 1905
- Adolf Michaelis (1835–1910)
- Heinrich Wilhelm Gottfried von Waldeyer-Hartz (1836–1921)
- Oswald Schmiedeberg (1838–1921)
- Gustav von Schmoller (1838–1917)
- Paul Laband (1838–1918)
- August Kundt (1839–1894)
- Bernhard Naunyn (1839–1925)
- Friedrich Kohlrausch (1840–1910)
- Rudolph Sohm (1841–1917)
- Heinrich Martin Weber (1842–1913)
- Paul Heinrich von Groth (1843–1927)
- Lujo Brentano (1844–1931)
- Gustav Schwalbe (1844–1916)
- Charles Louis Alphonse Laveran (1845–1922), Nobel Prize 1907
- Wilhelm Röntgen (1845–1923), Nobel Prize 1901
- Harry Bresslau (1848–1926)
- Ernst Remak (1849–1911)
- Josef von Mering (1849–1908)
- Georg Dehio (1850–1932)
- Karl Ferdinand Braun (1850–1918), Nobel Prize 1909
- Hans Chiari (1851–1916)
- Hermann Emil Fischer (1851–1919), Nobel Prize 1902
- Albrecht Kossel (1853–1927), Nobel Prize 1910
- Paul Ehrlich (1854–1915), Nobel Prize 1908
- Emil Cohn (1854–1944)
- Ludwig Döderlein (1855–1936)
- Otto Lehmann (1855–1922)
- Theobald von Bethmann Hollweg (1856–1921)
- Georg Simmel (1858–1918)
- Oskar Minkowski (1858–1931)
- Othmar Zeidler (1859–1911)
- Geerhardus Vos (1862–1949)
- Andreas von Tuhr (1864–1925)
- Pierre Weiss (1865–1940)
- Pieter Zeeman (1865–1943), Nobel Prize 1902
- Eugen Hirschfeld (1866–1946)
- Gustav Anrich (1867–1930)
- Georg Thilenius (1868–1937)
- Gustav Landauer (1870–1919)
- Franz Weidenreich (1873–1948)
- Otto Loewi (1873–1961), Nobel Prize 1936
- Karl Schwarzschild (1873–1916)
- Maximilian von Jaunez (1873–1947)
- William Popper (1874—1963)
- Erwin Baur (1875–1933)
- Albert Schweitzer (1875–1965), Nobel Prize 1952
- Ernest Esclangon (1876–1954)
- Paul Rohmer (1876–1977)
- Maurice René Fréchet (1878–1973)
- Helene Bresslau Schweitzer (1879–1957)
- Max von Laue (1879–1960), Nobel Prize 1914
- Leonid Mandelstam (1879–1944)
- René Leriche (1879–1955)
- Nikolai Papaleksi (1880–1947)
- Hans Kniep (1881–1930)
- Hermann Staudinger (1881–1965), Nobel Prize 1953
- Albert Gabriel (1883–1972), professor of Art history (1925–1926)
- Otto Fritz Meyerhof (1884–1951), Nobel Prize 1922
- Étienne Gilson (1884-1978)
- Pablo Groeber (1885–1964)
- Pierre Montet (1885–1966)
- Marc Bloch (1886–1944)
- Robert Schuman (1886–1963)
- Ernst Robert Curtius (1886–1956)
- Hans Schlossberger (1887–1960)
- Friedrich Wilhelm Levi (1888–1966)
- Carl Schmitt (1888–1985)
- Beno Gutenberg (1889–1960)
- André Danjon (1890–1967)
- Pauline Alderman (1893–1983)
- Henri Lefebvre (1901–1991)
- Michel Mouskhely (1903–1964)
- Jean Cavaillès (1903–1944)
- Louis Néel (1904–2000), Nobel Prize 1970
- Henri Cartan (1904–2008)
- Ernst Anrich (1906–2001)
- Emmanuel Levinas (1906–1995)
- Maurice Blanchot (1907–2003)
- Michael Ellis DeBakey (1908–2008)
- Antoinette Feuerwerker (1912–2003)
- Salomon Gluck (1914–1944)
- Wu Wenjun (1919-2017)
- Laurent Schwartz (1915–2002), Fields Medal 1950
- Hicri Fişek (1918–2002)
- Lucien Braun (1923–2020)
- René Thom (1923–2002), Fields Medal 1958
- Robert Preus (1924–1995)
- Francis Rapp (1926–2020)
- Milton Santos (1926–2001), Vautrin Lud Prize 1994
- Gabriel Vahanian (1927)
- Martin Karplus (1930), Nobel Prize 2013
- Yves Michaud (1930)
- Pierre Chambon (1931)
- John Warwick Montgomery (1931)
- Zemaryalai Tarzi (1933)
- Alberto Fujimori (1938–2024)
- Liliane Ackermann (1938–2007)
- Jean-Marie Lehn (1939), Nobel Prize 1987
- Philippe Lacoue-Labarthe (1940–2007)
- Yves Meyer (1940), Abel Prize 2017
- Jean-Luc Nancy (1940)
- Jules A. Hoffmann (1941), Nobel Prize 2011
- Katia Krafft (1942–1991)
- Jean-Pierre Sauvage (1944), Nobel Prize 2016
- Perla Serfaty (1944)
- Isaac Zokoué (1944–2014)
- Jean-Marc Egly (1945)
- Moncef Marzouki (1945)
- Kenneth Thibodeau (1945)
- Maurice Krafft (1946–1991)
- Jean-Louis Mandel (1946)
- Jacques Marescaux (1948)
- Arsène Wenger (1949)
- Jürgen Wöhler (1950)
- Patrick Strzoda (1952)
- Jean-Claude Juncker (1954)
- Thomas Ebbesen (1954)
- Pascal Mayer (1963)
- Philippe Horvath (1970)
- Luca Niculescu (1971)
- Simon Schraub

== Rankings ==
University rankings

Global – Overall
- ARWU World: 101–150 (2025)
- QS World: =420 (2026)
- THE World: 601–800 (2023)
- USNWR Global: =277 (2023)

== See also ==
- Reichsuniversität Straßburg
- Jardin botanique de l'Université de Strasbourg
- List of early modern universities in Europe
- On the Poverty of Student Life
- Musée de minéralogie
- Musée zoologique de la ville de Strasbourg
