= Jean-Pascal Tricoire =

French entrepreneur (born 1963)

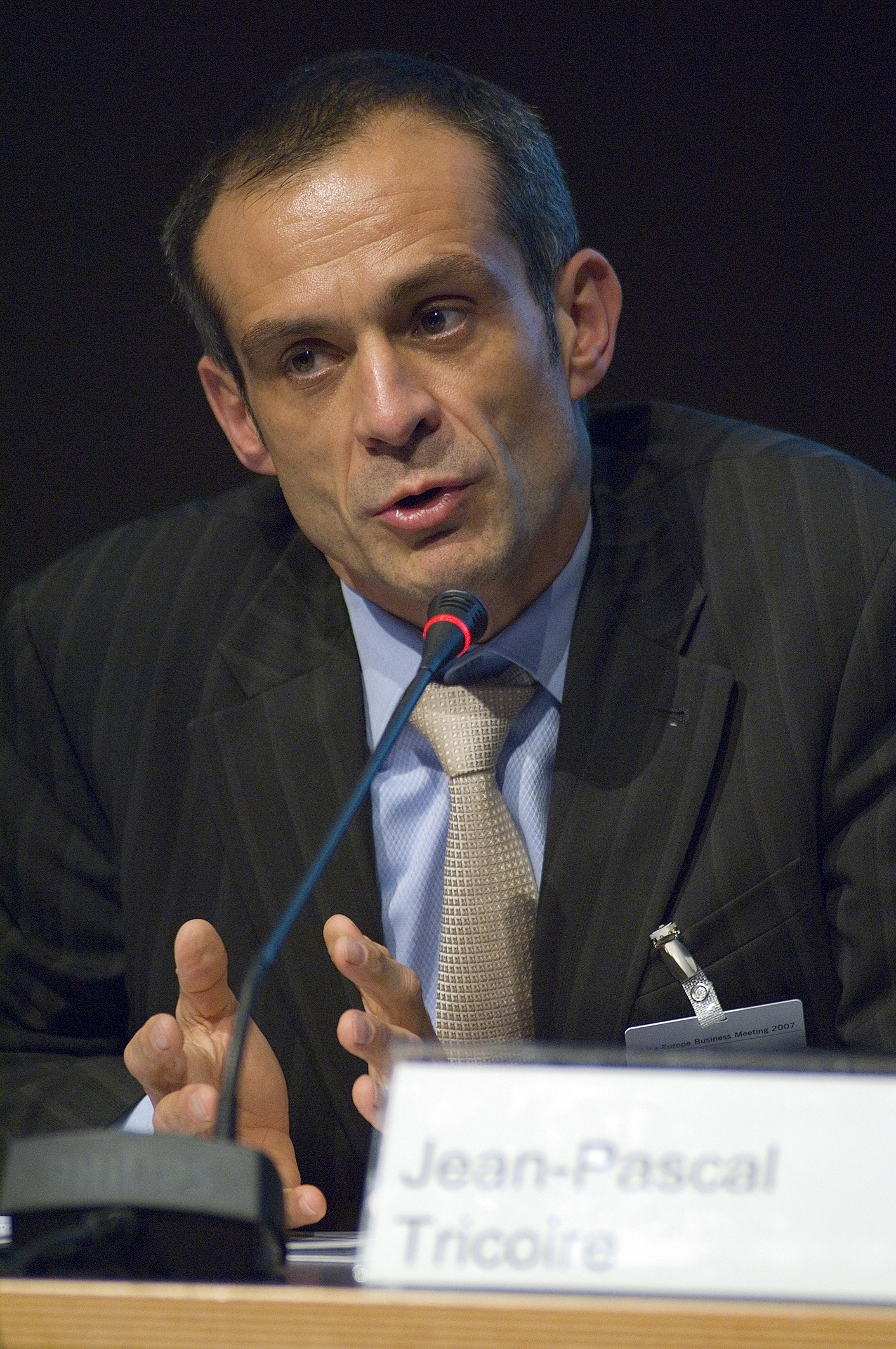
- Born: May 11, 1963 (age 62); Beaupréau-en-Mauges (France)
- Education: diplôme d'Ingénieur, Master of Business Administration
- Alma mater: École supérieure d'électronique de l'Ouest; Emlyon Business School
- Children: 3
- Awards: Chevalier of the Legion of Honour (2007); Officer of the National Order of Merit (2022)
- Website: blog.se.com/author/jean-pascal-tricoire/

Jean-Pascal Tricoire (born 1963) is a French business executive. Tricoire is the chairman of Schneider Electric, having served as the company's CEO from 2006 to 2023. Prior to his appointment as CEO, Tricoire held the role of Chief Operating Officer from 2003 to 2006, following his tenure as Executive Vice President of the International Division from 2002 to 2003.

Since 2020, he has also served as a member of the board of directors at Qualcomm.

== Career ==
=== Early career ===
After working at Alcatel, Schlumberger and Saint-Gobain between 1985 and 1986, Tricoire joined Merlin Gerin in 1986. In 1992, Merlin Gerin was acquired by Schneider Electric.

From 1988 to 1999, Tricoire developed the company's activity abroad, working in Italy for five years (1989–1994). Then, he worked in China for other five years (1994–1999) before managing operations in South Africa.

He then served in corporate functions as Head of Schneider Electric's Global Strategic Accounts and of the Schneider 2000+ program. From January 2002 to the end of 2003, he became Executive Vice President of the International Division, covering the company's business outside of North America and Europe.

=== Leadership of Schneider Electric ===
Jean-Pascal Tricoire became chief executive officer (CEO) of Schneider Electric in 2006, after serving as Chief Operating Officer from 2003 to 2006. In May 2013, Tricoire was appointed chairman and CEO of Schneider Electric, following a change in the governance of the company.

During his tenure, Schneider Electric underwent a strategic transformation from a traditional electrical equipment manufacturer into a global technology leader in energy management, automation and sustainability. Under Tricoire's leadership, the company quadrupled its revenues, and expanded its footprint across emerging markets, notably in Asia. He championed a purpose-driven strategy focused on digitization and electrification, and positioned Schneider Electric among the world's most sustainability corporations.

In May 2023, Tricoire stepped down as CEO of the company but remained its chairman.

== Boards and organizations ==
Tricoire is a Member of the Board of Trustees of Northeastern University, supporting its global engagement and innovation agenda.

He participates in the Community of Chairperson of the World Economic Forum, contributing to global discussions on climate action and emerging technologies.

He is a member of the International Advisory Council of the Singapore Economic Development Board (EDB), advising on strategic industrial and sustainability initiatives. In Asia, Tricoire serves on the advisory councils of Shanghai, Beijing, and Hong Kong, reflecting his deep engagement in Asia's innovation and policy landscape.

He has been member of the board of director of Qualcomm since 2020.

== Recognition ==
In 2019, Jean-Pascal Tricoire was named one of the top 100 Top Performing Chief Executives by the Harvard Business Review (HBR), ranking at #48.

In 2007, Tricoire became a Knight of the Order of the Legion of Honour (Chevalier de la Légion d’Honneur).

== Personal life ==
Jean-Pascal Tricoire is married and has three children. He speaks French, English, Italian and Chinese.

Business positions
Preceded by Henri Lachmann	Chairman and CEO of Schneider Electric; 2006–	Succeeded by Incumbent
