= Pramuan Tangboriboonrat =

Thai chemist (born 1962)

- ประมวล ตั้งบริบูรณ์รัตน์
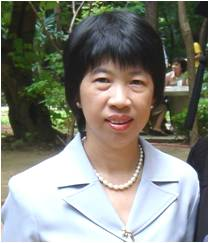
- Pramuan Tangboriboonrat, 2010
- Born: December 27, 1962 (age 63); Prachinburi province, Thailand
- Occupation: Chemist

Pramuan Tangboriboonrat (Thai: ประมวล ตั้งบริบูรณ์รัตน์, RTGS: Pramuan Tangboribunrat; born December 27, 1962) is a Thai professor of chemistry at Mahidol University and a governmental researcher specializing in colloidal polymers and natural rubber latex. Born in Prachinburi province, Thailand, she obtained a bachelor's degree in chemistry in 1983, before continuing on to a master's degree in the same field in 1986. This gave her the opportunity for a doctoral scholarship program in France where she completed her Ph.D. in 1991.

Tangboriboonrat immediately went on to hold a professorship at Mahidol University that same year and she advanced to a full professor position by 2004. During the rest of the 2000s, she held multiple governmental positions in the science and technology department while also continuing her teaching and research work. She would later assist the government in creating a plan through the National Research Council of Thailand (NRCT) to expand the number of scientists in the country to advance national research and development objectives for Thailand.

The recipient of multiple awards throughout her career, Tangboriboonrat was given the Young Scientist Award in Chemistry (Polymer) in 1996 and was one of the recipients of the 2007 L'Oréal-UNESCO Fellowship for Women in Science in the Materials Science category for her research on "Modification of Natural Rubber Surface with Nano-Particles for Medical Glove Preparation." She has been presented with several other awards and honors as well as three civil service awards from the Thai government due to her work. Her Royal Highness Princess Ubolratana Rajakanya Sirivadhana Barnavadi bestowed Tangboriboonrat an official research grant at Thewarat Sapharom Throne Hall, Phaya Thai Palace, on May 29, 2007.

== Early life and education ==
Pramuan Tangboriboonrat was born December 27, 1962 in Prachinburi province, Thailand. She attended elementary school at Phadungsit Pittaya Prachantakham School in Prachantakham district, middle school at Prachantrasatbamrung School, and high school at Wattana Wittaya Academy in Bangkok, graduating in 1979.

Tangboriboonrat then completed her bachelor's degree in chemistry with first class honors at Khon Kaen University in Khon Kaen province in 1983. She received the Outstanding Academic and Behavior Award from Khon Kaen University in 1981 and the Outstanding Score Award for the Bachelor of Science in Chemistry program from Khon Kaen University from Professor Dr. Thab Nilanidhi Foundation in 1983 and again in 1986 when she completed her master's degree in physical chemistry from Mahidol University. She received a scholarship from the French government to study for a doctorate degree at University of Upper Alsace; receiving the Diplôme Élémentaire de la Langue Française (DELF) at CAVILAM, Vichy in 1987, the Diplôme d'Étude Applofondie (DEA; Chimie Physique) in 1988 and a doctorate (Docteur; Macromolecular chemistry, Chimie Macromoléculaire) from the University of Upper Alsace, National Graduate School of Chemistry of Mulhouse, France in 1991.

== Career ==
After completing her doctorate in 1991, Tangboriboonrat entered the civil service as a lecturer in the Department of Chemistry, Faculty of Science, Mahidol University. She was appointed Assistant Professor in 1994, Associate Professor in 1997, and received the Royal Command of the Professorship in 2004.

Tangboriboonrat served as Secretary of the Thailand Academy of Science and Technology (2003–2006), Assistant to the President of the National Science and Technology Development Agency (2006–2008), and Secretary to the Minister of Science and Technology (October 2006 – January 2008). She is a member of the Academic Review Committees of Sirindhorn International Institute of Technology, Thammasat University; Rajamangala University of Technology - Phra Nakhon campus, and North Bangkok College.

The National Research Council of Thailand (NRCT) began funding other science programs in 1996 and raised the ratio of Thai R&D personnel from two per 10,000 to 10.5 per 10,000 people. Realizing that Thailand needed many more scientists to move from a middle-income country to a high-income country, Tangboriboonrat outlined a plan with the NRCT in 2023 to train more than 12,000 scientists within 20 years by funding 12,390 scholarships for science students. This program works with the Kanchanaphisek PhD Program (RGJ). Thailand traditionally has a severe shortage of PhD researchers. This program has a regional and global focus to increase the quality and stature of science in Thailand.

== Research ==
Tangboriboonrat's specialties are polymer colloids and surface modification of polymers. She studies natural rubber (NR) latex particle surfaces to discover new uses for natural rubber.

== Selected publications ==
=== Books ===
- Polpanich, D.; Tangboriboonrat, Pramuan; Elaissari, Abdelhamid (2008). "3, Evolution in Malaria Disease Detection: From Parasite Visualization to Colloidal-Based Rapid Diagnostic". Colloidal Nanoparticles in Biotechnology. New York: John Wiley & Sons. pp. 65–93. ISBN 9780470230527.
- Yuthawong, Yongyut; Theptharanon, Yodhathai; Tangboriboonrat, Pramuan; Kanokmethakul, Somdet (2006). อดีต ปัจจุบัน อนาคต วิทยาการเคมีและเภสัชไทย [Past, Present, Future of Thai Chemistry and Pharmacy] (in Thai). Bangkok: Foundation of the Science and Technology Council of Thailand. ISBN 9789749497128.
- Yuthawong, Yongyut; Tangboriboonrat, Pramuan (2006). บทบาทของวิทยาศาสตร์และเทคโนโลยีใหม่ในสังคมไทย: ยีน นาโนเทค ไอทีและสังคมไทย [The Role of Science and New Technology in Thai Society: Genes, Nanotechnology, IT and Thai Society] (in Thai). Bangkok: Foundation of the Science and Technology Council of Thailand. ISBN 9789749398791.
- Theptharanon, Yodhathai; Tangboriboonrat, Pramuan (2009). Mentor-mentee-mentoring: ศาสตร์และศิลป์ของการเป็นนักวิจัยพี่เลี้ยงที่ดี [Mentor-mentee-mentoring: The Science and Art of Being a Good Mentoring Researcher] (in Thai) (2 ed.). Bangkok: Foundation of the Science and Technology Council of Thailand. ISBN 9786161200091.
- Theptharanon, Yodhathai; Tangboriboonrat, Pramuan, eds. (2005). การเขียนบทความวิจัยระดับนานาชาติด้านวิทยาศาสตร์และเทคโนโลยี [Writing International Research Articles in Science and Technology] (in Thai). Bangkok: Foundation of the Science and Technology Council of Thailand. ISBN 974927444X.
- Tangboriboonrat, Pramuan (2004). พอลิเมอร์คอลลอยด์ กรุงเทพมหานคร [Polymer Colloid] (in Thai). Bangkok: Ruaycharoen Printing. ISBN 9749021770.
- Theptharanon, Yodhathai; Tangboriboonrat, Pramuan, eds. (2002). นาโนเทคโนโลยี เทคโนโลยีซูเปอร์จิ๋ว [Nanotechnology, Superminiature Technology] (in Thai). Bangkok: Foundation of the Science and Technology Council of Thailand. ISBN 9789742292836.

=== Articles ===
- Pukveera, Nichapat; Tangboriboonrat, Pramuan; et al. (May 2025). "Hollow amorphous TiO2 particles for transparent UV shielding film". Progress in Organic Coatings. 202 109141. doi:10.1016/j.porgcoat.2025.109141.
- Promlok, Duangkamol; Tangboriboonrat, Pramuan; et al. (December 2024). "Parameters Governing Void Formation and Expansion of Hollow Natural Rubber Latex Particles for Their Use as Bio-based Nanocapsules". Macromolecular Reaction Engineering. 19 (1) 2400036. doi:10.1002/mren.202400036.
- Suwannin, Patcharapan; Tangboriboonrat, Pramuan; et al. (August 2024). "Pathogenic Leptospira Detection in Environmental Contaminant Watr Soureces by Highly Performance Antibody Absorption Polystyrene Agglutinating Particles". Particle and Particle Systems Characterization. 41 (12) 2400023. doi:10.1002/ppsc.202400023.
- Lekjinda, Kritsadayut; Tangboriboonrat, Pramuan; et al. (August 2024). "Ag/Au-incorporated trimethyl chitosan-shell hybrid particles as reinforcing and antioxidant fillers for trimethyl chitosan hydrogel". Carbohydrate Polymers. 37 122132. doi:10.1016/j.carbpol.2024.122132. PMID 38710548.
- Promlok, Duangkamol; Tangboriboonrat, Pramuan; et al. (January 2024). "Fabrication of hollow magnetic polyaniline particles via in-situ polymerization in one-pot for UV–Vis-NIR and EMI applications". Progress in Organic Coatings. 186 (27) 108002. doi:10.1016/j.porgcoat.2023.108002.
- Kraithep, Chanyanuch; Tangboriboonrat, Pramuan; et al. (February 2023). "Fabrication of porous polymer particles containing BiVO4 and Fe3O4 nanoparticles using block copolymer as porogen for effective dye removal". Surfaces and Interfaces. 37 102738. doi:10.1016/j.surfin.2023.102738.
- Kaewsaneha, Chariya; Tangboriboonrat, Pramuan; et al. (December 2022). "Hybrid MXene (Ti3C2Tx)/polyaniline nanosheets as additives for enhancing anticorrosion properties of Zn-epoxy coating". Progress in Organic Coatings. 173 107173. doi:10.1016/j.porgcoat.2022.107173.
- Teawprasong, Patcharapong; Tangboriboonrat, Pramuan; et al. (November 2022). "Solvent-sensitive nanoparticle-enhanced PCR assay for the detection of enterotoxigenic Escherichia coli". Scientific Reports. 12 (1) 20677. Bibcode:2022NatSR..1220677T. doi:10.1038/s41598-022-25088-3. PMC 9712428. PMID 36450862.
- Promlok, Duangkamol; Tangboriboonrat, Pramuan; et al. (November 2022). "Hollow natural rubber latex particles as bio-based alternative white pigment for coating applications". Industrial Crops and Products. 188 (4) 115593. doi:10.1016/j.indcrop.2022.115593.
- Jangpatarapongsa, Kulachart; Tangboriboonrat, Pramuan; et al. (December 2021). "Increased sensitivity of enterotoxigenic Escherichia coli detection in stool samples using oligonucleotide immobilized-magnetic nanoparticles". Biotechnology Reports. 32 e00677. doi:10.1016/j.btre.2021.e00677. PMC 8487978. PMID 34631437.

== Awards ==
2024	60 Years Khon Kaen University's Alumni Award Winner (Education and Research)
2022	For being awarded the National Research Award 2022 in Physical Sciences and Mathematics
2012	Outstanding Alumni Award from Faculty of Graduate Studies, Mahidol University
2012	Outstanding Lecturer Award (High Level) from Council of Faculty of Science Senate
2007	L'Oréal Thailand "For Women in Science" Research Grant L'Oréal-UNESCO Fellowship for Women in Science in Materials Science
1999	Research work was selected as one of 15 outstanding research works of NRCT
1997	Award from Eno Science Foundation (Japan)
1996	Young Scientist Award from the Foundation for the Promotion of Science and Technology under the Royal Patronage

=== Insignia commendations ===
- 2017 – Chakra Mala Medal (R.C.P.)
- 2014 – The Most Exalted Order of the White Elephant, Highest Class, Knight Grand Cordon (KGE)
- 2009 – The Most Noble Order of the Crown of Thailand, Highest Class, The Most Exalted Order of the Crown of Thailand (M.W.M.)
