= Simon Schraub =

French cancer researcher

Simon Schraub is a French academic and cancer researcher. He is a professor emeritus at the University of Strasbourg.

Schraub created and organized cancer treatment and care in Franche-Comté from 1970 to 1997. On September 1, 1997, he was appointed as Director of the Paul Strauss Center for the Fight against Cancer in Strasbourg; he led this position from 1997 to 2004.

== Biography ==
Schraub is known for his research work on cancer. He was part of the commission formed by the Minister of Health, Georgina Dufoix, in 1985 to research on cancer.

As head of the Besancon Oncology Service, Schraub created the Doubs Tumor Registry in 1976. He took part in epidemiological studies survival of cancers throughout a department, epidemiological study of cancers of the upper aerodigestive tract, fallout of Chernobyl, measurement of the effectiveness of the screening campaign for cervical cancer in the Doubs.

Schraub led research topics on the reintegration of cancer patients treated, the measurement of the quality of life of cancer patients treated, the relationship between the psyche and cancer, and parallel treatments in terms of cancer.

== Selected publications ==
- Evaluation in clinical practice of the quality of life of patients with VADS cancer
- French version of FACT-G: validation and comparison with other cancer-specific instruments
- Quality of life measurement in cancer survivors
- Conservative treatment of choroidal melanoma using iodine-125 brachytherapy

== Books ==
- Schraub, Simon (1987). Magie et la Raison (in French)
- Schraub, Simon (1999). New Therapies. Presses de la Renaissance

== Awards ==
- Legion of Honour
