= EUniverCities =

EUniverCities is a network of European universities and cities that was founded on January 27, 2012.

== Partners ==
- Aveiro (University of Aveiro)
- Exeter (University of Exeter)
- Ghent (Ghent University)
- Innsbruck (University of Innsbruck)
- Lausanne (University of Lausanne)
- Linköping (Linköping University)
- Lublin (Maria Curie Sklodowska University - Lublin)
- Magdeburg (Otto-von-Guericke University and University of Applied Sciences)
- Malaga (University of Malaga)
- Norrköping (Linköping University – Campus Norrköping)
- Olomouc (Palacký University) (since 2026)
- Parma (University of Parma)
- Strasbourg (University of Strasbourg)
- Timisoara (West University of Timişoara)
- Trondheim (University of Science and Technology)
- Turku (University of Turku and Åbo Akademi University).
