= Jean-Baptiste Donnet =

Jean-Baptiste Donnet (28 September 1923 in Pontgibaud (Puy-de-Dôme) – 30 November 2014 in Sentheim (Haut-Rhin)) was a French chemist who is noted as a pioneer in the surface chemistry of carbon black and as a founder of the Upper Alsace University.

He was the father of French journalist Pierre-Antoine Donnet.

== Biography ==
Jean-Baptiste Donnet, from a modest background, received his secondary education by correspondence, while an apprentice craftsman. After World War II, he earned his Bachelor of Science degree in chemical engineering.

His scientific career began in CNRS at Strasbourg, then Mulhouse from 1953. He is one of the founders in 1970 of the academic center of Mulhouse, which in 1975 became the University of Haute-Alsace.

== Career ==
- Professor (emeritus) of the Upper Alsace University
- former Research director at CNRS
- former President of the Société chimique de France
- former University president of the Upper Alsace University

== Recognitions ==
- Carl-Dietrich-Harries-Medal for commendable scientific achievements (1985)
- Colwyn medal in 1988
- Honorary Doctorate from the université de Neuchâtel (1993)
- Honorary Doctorate from the Lodz University of Technology (1989)
- Honorary President of the Upper Alsace University
- Honorary President of the Société chimique de France
- Commander of the Legion of Honor (decreed 19 April 2000)
- Charles Goodyear Medal (1998)
