= EUCOR =

Consortium of universities from France, Germany, Switzerland

Eucor – The European Campus
- Europäische Konföderation der Oberrheinischen Universitäten; Confédération européenne des Universités du Rhin Supérieur
- Established: 1989; 37 years ago
- President: Andrea Schenker-Wicki (Rector of the University of Basel)
- Academic staff: 15,000
- Students: 117,000
- Doctoral students: 13,500
- Location: Freiburg im Breisgau (Germany); Karlsruhe (Germany); Strasbourg (France); Mulhouse / Colmar (France); Basel (Switzerland)
- Language: French, German
- Website: www.eucor-uni.org

EUCOR (German: Europäische Konföderation der Oberrheinischen Universitäten, French: Confédération européenne des Universités du Rhin Supérieur, transl. European Confederation of Upper-Rhine Universities) is a tri-national association of five universities in the Upper Rhine region with two universities from Germany, two from France, and one from Switzerland. It was originally founded in 1989 and was reorganised as a European Grouping of Territorial Cooperation (EGTC) in 2015.

== Members ==
In 2019, the consortium includes about 117,000 students, 15,000 teachers, and researchers and 13,500 doctoral students, a large number of faculties, institutes and laboratories in almost all fields with a total annual budget of more than 2.3 billion euros. EUCOR members are:

- Karlsruhe Institute of Technology (KIT), Germany
- University of Freiburg, Germany
- University of Strasbourg, France
- University of Upper Alsace (UHA), France
- University of Basel, Switzerland
