= University of Upper Alsace =

University in Mulhouse and Colmar, France

- Université de Haute-Alsace
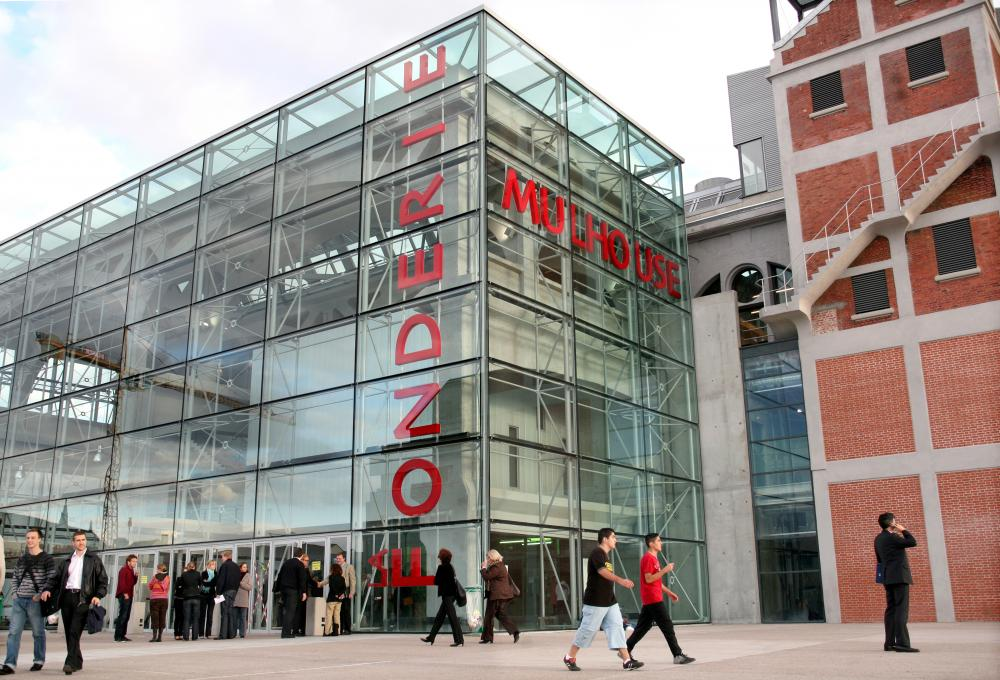
- La Fonderie Campus of Université de Haute-Alsace
- Established: 1975
- Affiliations: EUCOR
- President: Christine Gangloff-Ziegler
- Students: 8353 (in 2017)
- Location: Mulhouse and Colmar, Alsace, France
- Website: http://www.uha.fr/
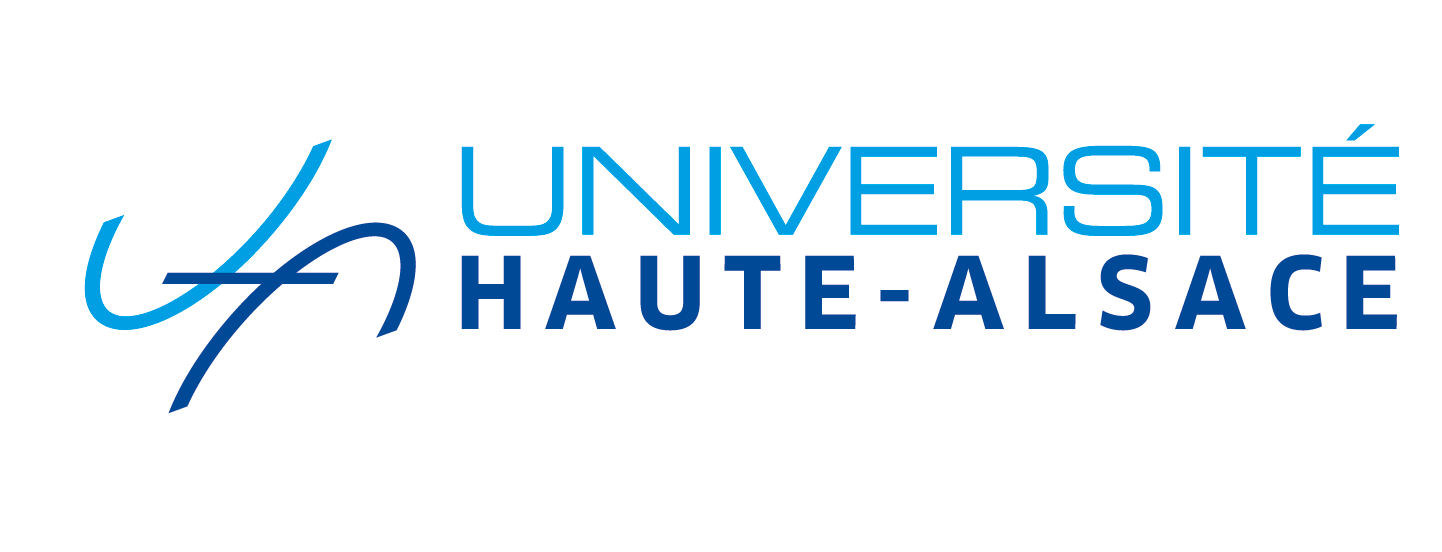

University of Upper Alsace (French: Université de Haute-Alsace, UHA) is a multidisciplinary teaching and research centre based in the two cities of Mulhouse and Colmar, France. Research and teaching at UHA concentrates mainly on science, technology, economics, management, arts and humanities. In 2017, UHA has more than 8000 students with about a hundred courses offered. The founding of UHA was driven by social and business players, among them was Jean-Baptiste Donnet.

The special geographical situation of UHA, which lies close to the Swiss and German borders, is favourable to the emergence of single courses leading to double or triple degrees that are recognized in the neighbouring countries. Together with Albert Ludwigs University of Freiburg, University of Basel, Karlsruhe Institute of Technology, as well as University of Strasbourg, the university of Upper Alsace is a member of the EUCOR, which is a trinational cross-border alliance of five universities on the Upper Rhine in the border region between Germany, France and Switzerland.

== History ==
In 2013, the University of Upper Alsace joined the University of Strasbourg.

== Departments ==
The university consists of five faculties:

- FLSH - Faculte des Lettres, Langues et Sciences Humaines
- FSESJ - Faculte des Sciences Economiques, Sociales et Juridiques
- FST - Faculte des Sciences et Techniques
- PEPS - Pluridisciplinaire d'Enseignement Professionnalisé Supérieur
- FMA - Faculte de Marketing et Agrosciences

two institutes of technology:

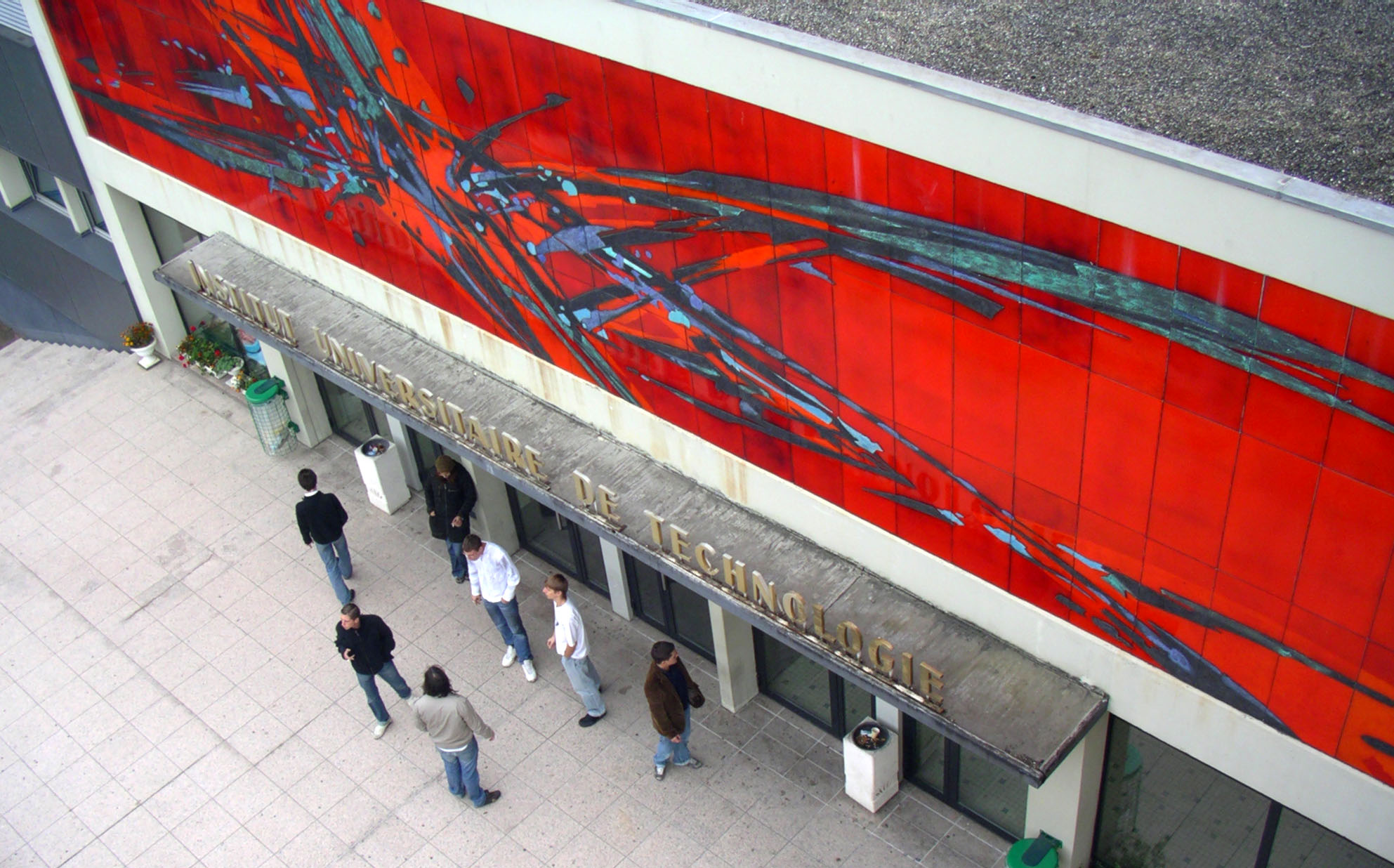
IUT de Mulhouse

- IUT DE COLMAR - Institut Universitaire de Technologie de Colmar
- IUT DE MULHOUSE - Institut Universitaire de Technologie de Mulhouse

and two schools of engineering:

- ENSCMu - Ecole Nationale Superieure de Chimie de Mulhouse
- ENSISA - Ecole Nationale Superieure d'Ingénieurs Sud Alsace (Merger in 2006 between ENSITM and ESSAIM)

== Notable people ==
Faculty

- Bernard Heyberger (born 1954) - specialist in the history of Middle Eastern Christianity
- Jennifer K Dick (born 1970) - American poet, translator and educator/scholar

Alumni

- Mehmet Çekiç (born 1970) - Turkish Paralympic alpine skier
- Pramuan Tangboriboonrat (born 1962) - Thai academic and governmental researcher
- Tamara el-Zein (born 1977) - Lebanese Minister of Environment

== See also ==
- Upper Alsace
