= Andreas von Tuhr =

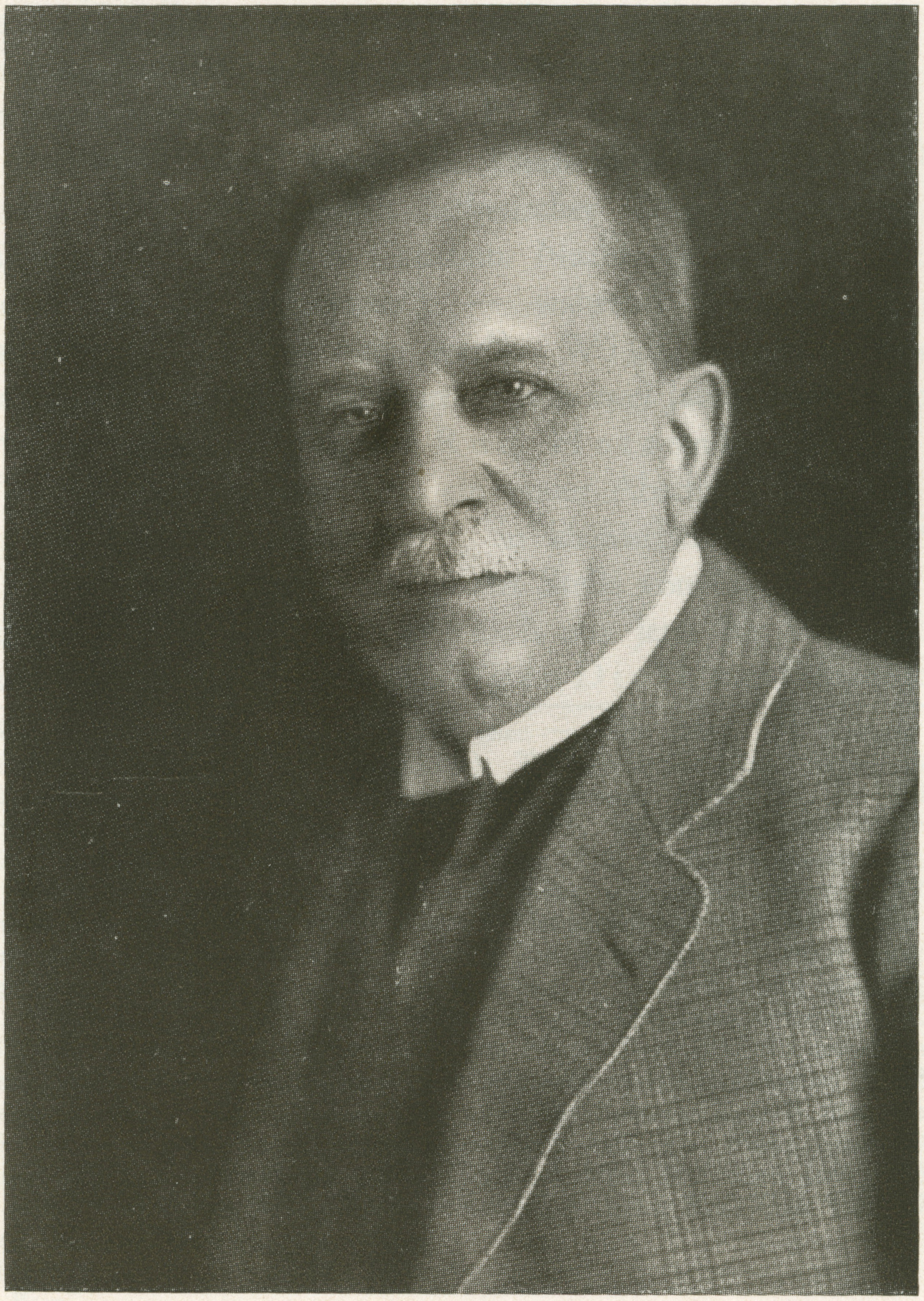
- Born: 14 February 1864; Saint Petersburg, Russian Empire
- Died: 16 December 1925 (aged 61); Zürich, Switzerland
- Resting place: Wolfgottesacker, Basel
- Education: University of Heidelberg
- Occupation: Lawyer

Andreas von Tuhr (14 February 1864 – 16 December 1925) was a Russian-German jurist, whose work on the fundamental conceptions of private law within the civilian tradition has been of lasting significance.

== Life and career ==
Von Tuhr was born in St Petersburg to a family of German ethnicity on 14 February 1864. When he was still a child, they moved to Germany. He studied at the universities of Heidelberg, Leipzig and Strasbourg and was much influenced by Bernhard Windscheid and Ernst Bekker. He gained his doctorate summa cum laude in 1885 at Heidelberg where his Der Nothstand im Civilrecht was published in 1888. In 1891 he was appointed as lecturer at the University of Basel, and was promoted to full professor in 1893. He married Johanna Rentzell in 1892.

In 1898 he was appointed to a chair at the University of Strasbourg and later became the university rector. It was here that he wrote his seminal multi-volume work Der allgemeine Teil des deutschen bürgerlichen Rechts (1910 to 1918). When Alsace-Lorraine came under French control at the end of 1918, he had to leave his post. After two years in Germany he returned to Switzerland, taking up a chair at the University of Zürich. There he wrote a major work on the Swiss law of obligations, Allgemeiner Teil des schweizerischen Obligationenrechts, published shortly before his death on 16 December 1925.

His emotional attachment to Russia remained with him through life, and throughout his life he retained his Russian citizenship, though also taking out German citizenship as an adult.

"A classical representative of civil law doctrinalism in the German Pandectist tradition" and "one of the most famous German civil lawyers of his time", the influence of his thinking was not limited to Germany and Switzerland. His Der allgemeine Teil des deutschen bürgerlichen Rechts "is, notwithstanding its title, of European, and not only of German, significance." This work has been twice translated into Spanish. The University of Kyoto's civil law library is built on von Tuhr's own collection and named in his honour.

== Published works ==
- Der Nothstand im Civilrecht (1888)
- Zur Schätzung des Schadens in der Lex Aquilia (1892)
- Actio de in rem verso; zugleich ein Beitrag zur Lehre von der Geschäftsführung (1895)
- Zur Lehre von den abstrakten Schuldverträgen nach dem BGB (1903)
- Zur Lehre von der Anweisung (1906)
- Der allgemeine Teil des deutschen bürgerlichen Rechts (1910 - 1918)
- Allgemeiner Teil des schweizerischen Obligationenrechts (1924 - 1925)
- Partie générale du Code fédéral des obligations (1929 - 1931, translation into French by Maurice de Torrenté and Emile Thilo of Allgemeiner Teil des schweizerischen Obligationenrechts
- Jus und Johanna : Liebesbriefe eines Juristen (1938, edited by J.K. von der Mühll-von Tuhr)
- Derecho civil : teoría general del derecho civil alemán (1998, translation into Spanish by Tito Ravá of Der allgemeine Teil des deutschen bürgerlichen Rechts Stämpfli Verlag AG, Bern
- Parte general del derecho civil(2006, translation into Spanish by Wenceslao Roces of Der allgemeine Teil des deutschen bürgerlichen Rechts>
