= Wenceslao Roces =

Spanish Roman law professor and translator

Wenceslao Roces Suárez
- Roces in the late 1970s in the Calle Fruela in Oviedo
- Born: 3 February 1897; Soto de Sobrescobio, Oviedo, Asturias, Spain
- Died: 29 March 1992 (aged 95); Mexico City, Mexico
- Occupation: Professor
- Known for: Translations of Marxist Writings

Wenceslao Roces Suárez (3 February 1897 – 29 March 1992) was a Spanish professor of Roman law, a prolific translator and undersecretary of the Ministry of Education and Fine Arts. He was a committed Marxist, and had to leave Spain after the Spanish Civil War (1936–39). While in exile he taught at the University of Santiago, the University of Havana and the National Autonomous University of Mexico. He returned to Spain and became a Senator for Asturias for a while before returning to Mexico, where he died.

== Life ==
Wenceslao Roces Suárez was born on 3 February 1897 in Soto de Sobrescobio, Oviedo, Asturias. His parents were Lucas Roces and María Suárez. He graduated in Law from the University of Oviedo and took his doctorate from the University of Madrid in 1922. He then studied in Germany, and at the age of 26 was given the chair of Roman Law at the University of Salamanca. There he taught historical legal studies until 1931. He published several articles in the Revista de derecho privado of Madrid.

Roces married Carmen Dorronsoro, with whom he had two children. He was drawn into the turbulent politics of Spain in the inter-war years, and became a militant activist in the Spanish Communist Party. He would remain a committed Marxist until his death. From 1936 to 1939 he was Undersecretary of the Ministry of Education and Fine Arts in the Republican government. He also directed the Cénit and Logos publishing houses, and translated many works into Spanish from different languages, but mainly from German. After the end of the Spanish Civil War (1936–39), Roces was forced to leave Spain. He taught at the universities of Santiago, Chile and Havana, Cuba between 1940 and 1942. He then moved to the National Autonomous University of Mexico intending to teach Roman Law at the Faculty of Law. He chose to join the Faculty of Arts, where he was a full professor and taught Greek History, History of Rome, Historical Materialism & Ancient History and Marxist Philosophy. After returning to Spain he was elected Senator, but resigned from that position due to disagreement with the direction of the Communist Party of Spain, and went back to Mexico.

Wenceslao Roces died in Mexico City on 29 March 1992 due to a myocardial infarction and is buried in the Pantheon Garden of Mexico, Federal District.

== Publications ==
Roces published translations of work by a wide variety of authors including Ernst Bloch, Fernand Braudel, Jacob Burckhardt, Ernst Cassirer, Victor Prosper Considerant, Heinrich August Aemilius Danz, Wilhelm Dilthey, Johann Gustav Droysen, Hermann Duncker, Friedrich Engels, Ernst Fischer, Hans Albrecht Fischer, Georg Friederici, Ludwig Friedländer, Oskar Georg Fischbach, Ernst Glaeser, Ferdinand Gregorovius, Eli Heckscher, Georg Wilhelm Friedrich Hegel, Johan Huizinga, Wilhelm von Humboldt, Werner Jaeger, Hans Kelsen, Theodor Kipp, F. V. Konstantinov, Alexandre Koyré, Paul Lafargue, Otto Lenel, Vladimir Lenin, Karl Marx, Gustav Mayer, Robert Von Mayr, Franz Mehring, Adolf Merkel, Theodor Mommsen, Paul Oertmann, Gustav Radbruch, Leopold von Ranke, Erich Maria Remarque, Erwin Rohde, Mark M. Rosental, Rudolph Sohm, Vladimir Gordeevich Sorin, Philipp Spitta, Joseph Stalin, Rudolf Stammler, Max Stainitzer, John Addington Symonds, Wilhelm Szilasi, Leon Trotsky, Andreas von Tuhr, Wilhelm Windelband, Clara Zetkin and Stefan Zweig.

His own writing includes:

- Roces, Wenceslao (1920). El caso fortuito en el derecho de obligaciones, tesis de doctorado. Universidad de Central de Madrid, Facultad de Derecho.
- Roces, Wenceslao (1924). "Creación de un Seminario de Estudios Jurídicos en la Universidad de Salamanca". RGLJ. 145: 714–717.
- Beylj, Grigorii; Panteleev, L. (1930). La república de los vagabundos. Prologue by Wenceslao Roces. Madrid: Cenit.
- Feine, E. (1930). Las sociedades de responsabilidad limitada. Prologue by Wenceslao Roces. Madrid: Logos.
- Lasalle, Ferdinand (1931). ¿Qué es una Constitución?, con una Introducción Histórica de Franz Mehring. Prologue by Wenceslao Roces. Madrid: Cenit.
- Marx, Karl; Engles, Friedrich (1932). El manifiesto comunista. Historical introduction by Wenceslao Roces, Notes by D. Riazanof. Madrid.
- Roces, Wenceslao (1941). El camino de la riqueza. Hechos y doctrinas. Cuatro conferencias pronunciadas en la Institución Hispano-Cubana de Cultura, de la Habana, en enero-febrero de 1941. Havana.
- Roces, Wenceslao; Manzano, Veneranda G. (1943). La cultura y la sanidad en España bajo el Franquisimo.
- Marx, Karl (1945). Historia crítica de la teoría de la plusvalía. Prologue by Wenceslao Roces, 3 volumes. México: FCE.
- Roces, Wenceslao (1951). Algunas consideraciones sobre el vicio del modernismo en la historia antigua. México: UNAM.
- Roces, Wenceslao (July 1972). Necesidad de actualizar la enseñanza del Derecho Romano. Derecho Romano y marxismo. II Congreso interamericano de Derecho Romano. UNAM.
- Suárez, Wenceslao Roces (1973). Homenaje a Chile y a Pablo Neruda.
- Roces, Wenceslao (1977). La cultura de nuestro tiempo y los problemas de la Universidad.

== Sources ==
- Martínez Chávez, Eva Elizabeth (29 February 2012). "ROCES SUÁREZ, Wenceslao (1897-1992)" (in Spanish). Universidad Carlos III de Madrid.
- Schettino Maimón, Ernesto (2015). "Wenceslao Roces" (in Spanish). Faculty of Philosophy and Literature, UNAM.
