= Musée de minéralogie =

Museum in Strasbourg, France

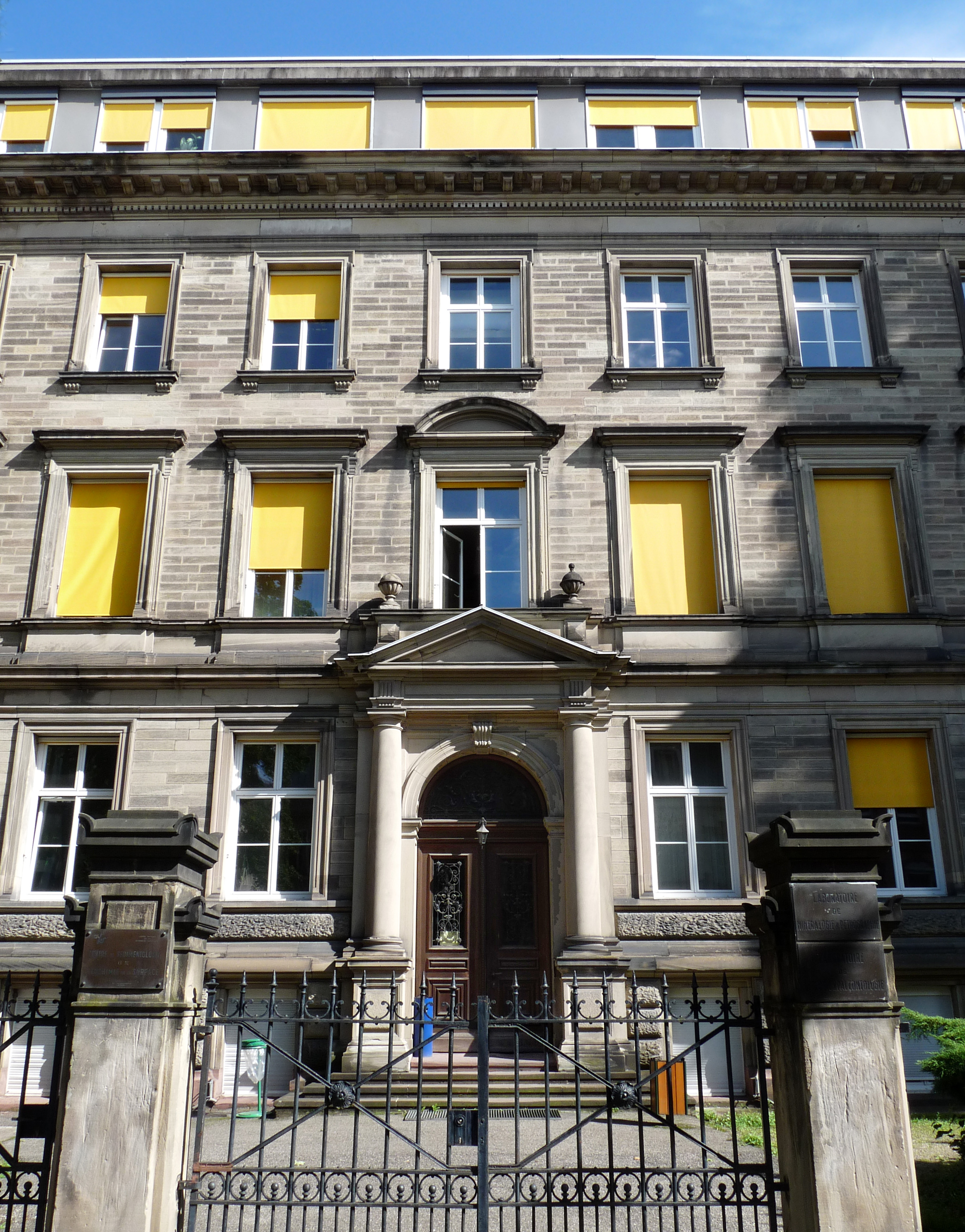
Musée de minéralogie

The Musée de minéralogie (Museum of Mineralogy) is a museum in Strasbourg in the Bas-Rhin department of France. It belongs to the University of Strasbourg, and displays historical collections of minerals. The museum was founded in 1890.

The museum is located in the Paleontology and Mineralogy faculty building of the University of Strasbourg. Two rooms are dedicated to him in a building of the School and Observatory of Earth Sciences (EOST) also housing the Laboratory of Hydrology and Geochemistry.

== Mineral collection ==
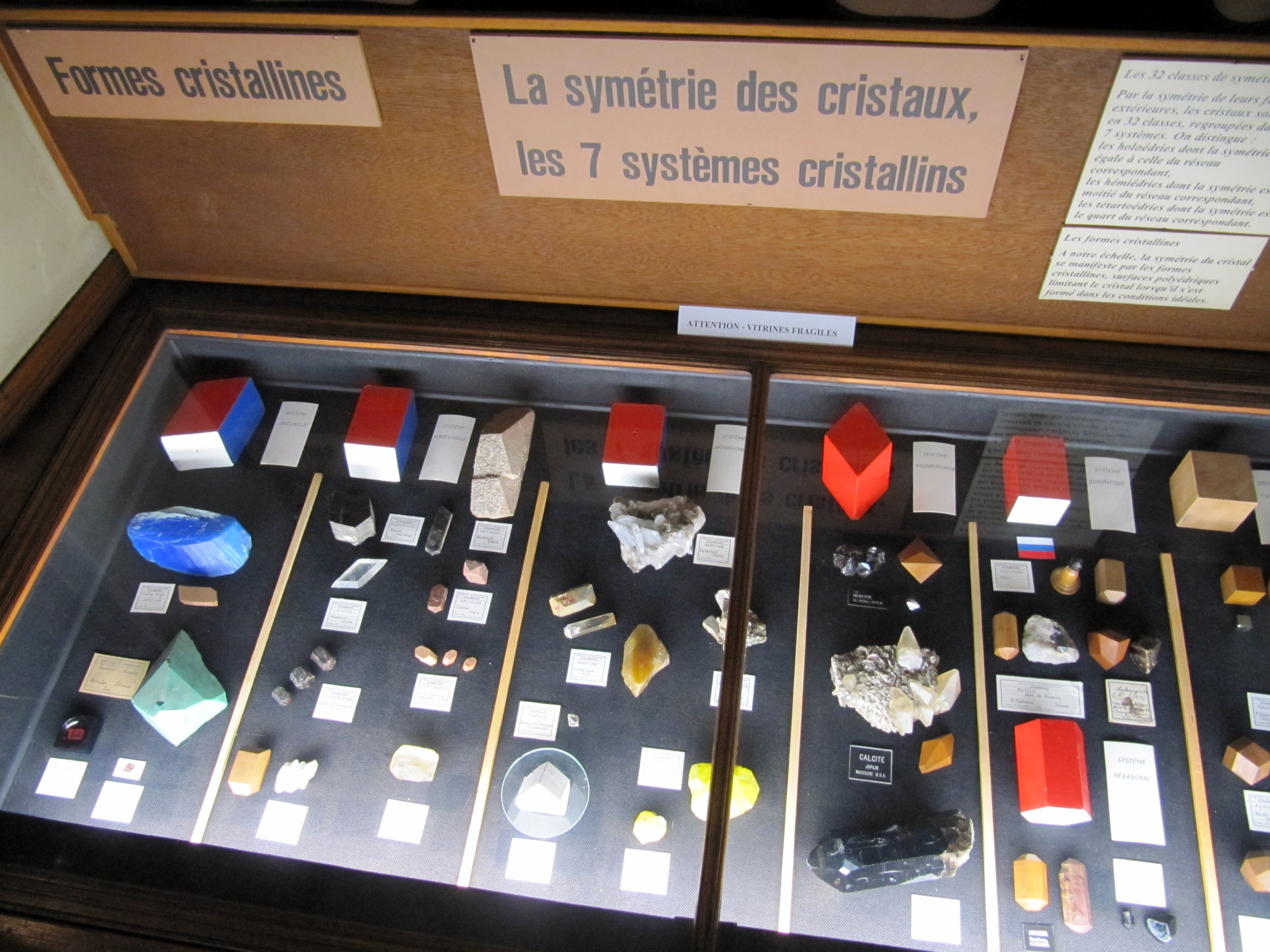
An exhibit

The origin of the mineral collection is the work of a professor of medicine from Strasbourg, Johann Hermann, who had set up a cabinet of curiosities in the 18th century. The museum is home to over 30,000 mineral samples. Gems and stones from France, Germany, the former Soviet Union (most notably Russia), Romania and USA are exhibited. The collections include a cast of the largest single piece of gold ever found (a 68 kg lump of gold, found in Australia). Also of special interest is the "box with fluorescent stones", with minerals illuminated by ultra-violet rays.

== Collection of meteorites ==
The museum keeps a remarkable collection of 450 samples of meteorites. It is the second largest collection in France after that of the National Museum of Natural History in Paris.

Most of the meteorites were acquired around 1900 by the Imperial University. The main founders of this original collection were professors of international reputation: Paul Groth, mineralogist, and Émile Cohen, petrographer. After their departure, it was actively pursued by Wilhelm Brühns and Hugo Bücking (de), mineralogists. We owe especially to Émile Cohen the constitution of a collection of plaster models after originals of which there are still 44 samples. It is the only collection of this type in France.

Although it has hardly changed since 1918, the collection is represented by the different varieties of meteorites identified to date, including a fragment of the oldest, which fell in Europe around 1400.

It has been classified according to the classification of Wasson.

== Collection of scientific instruments ==
X-ray generators, one of the oldest electron diffractors built in France after 1950, cathode ray tubes from Crookes, Coolidge, Hadding, X-ray emission devices created in the former mineralogy laboratory, old crystallographic instruments (polarizing and converging light microscopes, Wollaston and Groth goniometers, theodolite, reflection) constitute a remarkable batch of scientific apparatus from the 19th and 20th centuries.

== Educational collections ==
Crystallographic models in glass and cardboard, wood and colored wire, as well as pastels formerly intended for teaching occupy several showcases. They constitute a valuable collection of European quality.
