= Henri Lachmann =

- Born: 13 September 1938
- Awards: Order of the Rising Sun, Gold and Silver Star (Pour sa contribution au développement des échanges franco-japonais notamment dans le domaine économique., 2011)

Henri Lachmann (born September 13, 1938) is a French business executive. He was chairman and CEO of Schneider Electric from 1999 to 2005.

== Career ==
Born in Colmar, Lachmann graduated from HEC Paris in 1961, becoming a chartered accountant. He began his career at Arthur Andersen as an auditor, before being promoted as director of the accounting audit department.

In 1970, he became the head of planning of Strafor, before becoming its president in 1981.

During his tenure, he restructured the company, closing steel mills and developing the office supply activity. In 1990, he also oversaw the merger with Facom.

In 1996, he joined Schneider Electric, replacing Didier Pineau-Valencienne as CEO in 1999. The beginning of his tenure was marked by the merger between Schneider Electric and Legrand falling through.

He stepped down from executive responsibilities in 2005, while remaining the head of the company's supervisory board.

== Awards and recognition ==
- Honorary doctorate from the Grenoble École de management (2008)
