= Role of Utah in World War II =

The U.S. state of Utah's role in World War II supported the Allied effort through military bases established in the state, as well as its natural resources.

Federal investment in Utah had been limited prior to World War II, and the Great Depression had hit the state hard. The United States' entry into World War II changed Utah substantially, primarily because federal defense installations became a main part of Utah's economy.

== Military bases ==
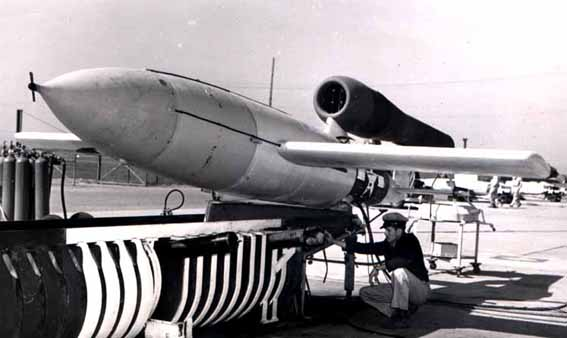
Plane being inspected at Wendover Air Field

Prior to World War II, military installations in Utah included Fort Douglas and the Ogden Arsenal. Both grew substantially during World War II, including the Army's Ninth Service Command moving to Fort Douglas from San Francisco after the attack on Pearl Harbor. But during World War II, the federal government opened an additional 13 new military and naval bases in the state. Across these installations, nearly 40,000 new jobs were created, providing a substantial economic boost to the state.

The largest new base was Hill Field (now known as Hill Air Force Base). Established in 1940, Hill operated as a large Army Air Force supply and repair depot. At its peak, Hill was the largest employer in the state, employing 15,000 civilians, 6,000 military personnel, and several thousand prisoners of war.

=== Strategic location ===
Utah was an ideal location for U.S. military bases during World War II for a number of reasons. Because it is located more than 700 miles from the Pacific Coast and with mountainous terrain, it was deemed safe from potential enemy attacks like the one at Pearl Harbor. Additionally, Utah served as a central connector on transcontinental railroad and highways to the three key West Coast shipping ports that were key to the war effort: Seattle, San Francisco, and Los Angeles. In particular, the Wasatch Front, being nearly equidistant between the three, was attractive given the easy ability to transfer war material between the military centers in those cities and the military installations in Utah.

Finally, Utah's geographic features made it an attractive site, especially given that many of these were already federal land under the auspices of the Department of the Interior. Wendover, Utah, for example, site of the new Wendover Air Base, had a population of just 103 people but was surrounded by flat federal lands, including the transcontinental railroad. The weather, with little rain or snow, made it ideal for year-round flight training

== Natural resources ==
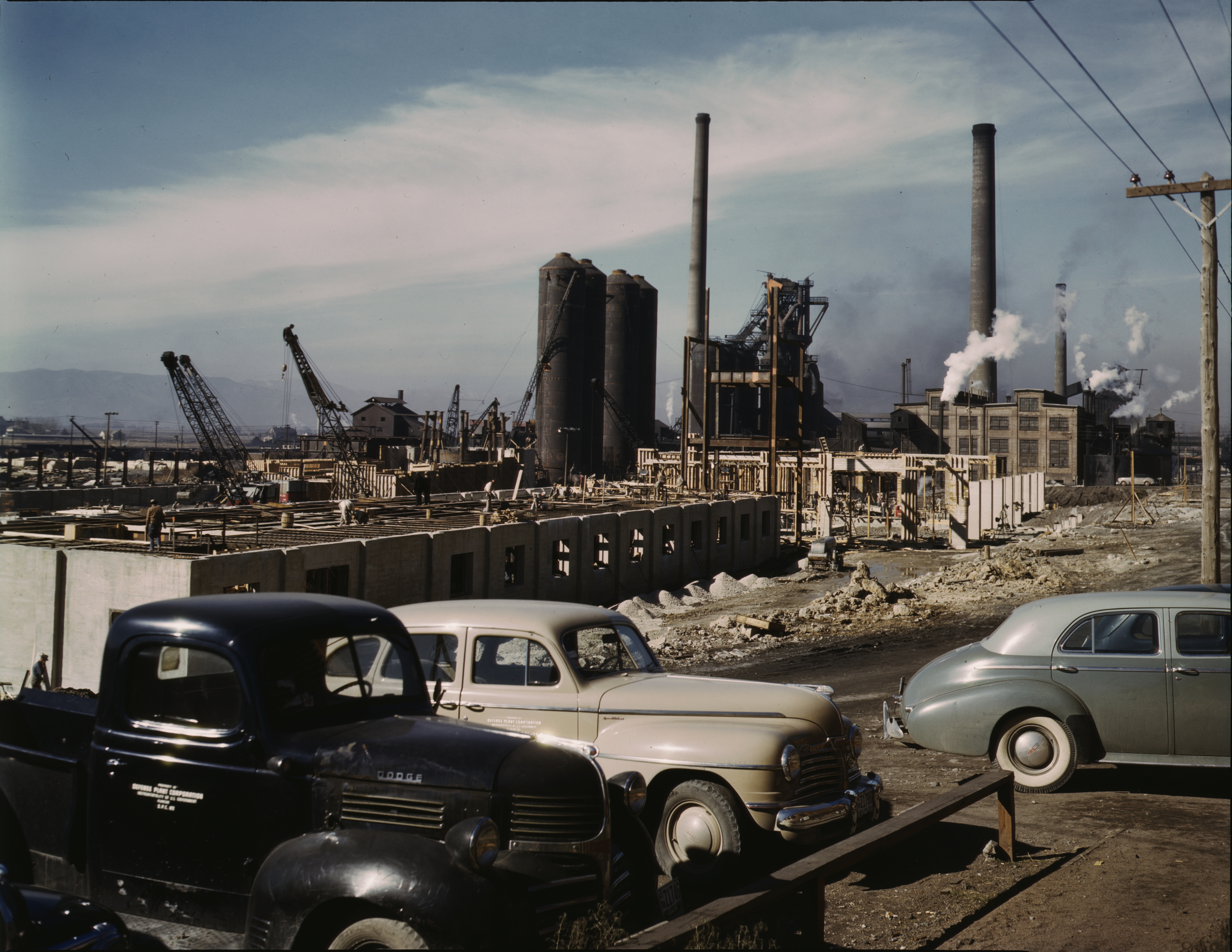
Geneva Steel Factory, November 1942

Utah's natural resources also contributed to U.S. efforts in World War II. Utah had already been extracting natural resources prior to the war, but ramped up efforts to extract and refine coal, iron, and copper.

The largest impact was from Geneva Steel Works in Orem, Utah. The factory began producing steel in 1944, and at its peak employed 4,200 workers. When operated by the government during World War II, it produced 634,010 tons of plate steel and 144,280 tons of shaped steel.

Other mines for natural resources also grew; state politicians found great success securing federal money to expand industrial plants during World War II, financing 91% of it through federal funds. While the national average per-capita federal expenditure for a plant during that time was $188, in Utah it was $534.

== People from Utah ==
While in 1941, only 7,000 people in the military service were from Utah, that number had grown to 62,107 by 1945. Utahns served in the war throughout Europe, North Africa, and the Pacific, including one group of ski troops, who were assigned to prepare for warfare in the mountains of Italy.

=== Women's role ===
In 1945, 1,343 of the 62,107 people from Utah serving in the military were women. Some served as nurses or pilot in the Women Airforce Service Pilots program.

Additionally, civilian women formed a Utah Minute Women group, being the first state to do so after a request from the federal War Production Board. Women volunteered to mobilize their communities to support the wartime salvage initiative collect wartime needs like tin cans, scrap metal, waste paper, and household fats, among others. The majority of the more than 300 million pounds of salvage materials collected in Utah came from the efforts of the approximately, 8,000 Minute Women in Utah.
