= Tubex =

Tubex may refer to:

- Tubex (syringe cartridge)
- Adrenocorticotropic hormone, by trade name Tubex
