= Elena Vishlenkova =

Russian historian, professor (born 1965)

- Елена Анатольевна Вишленкова
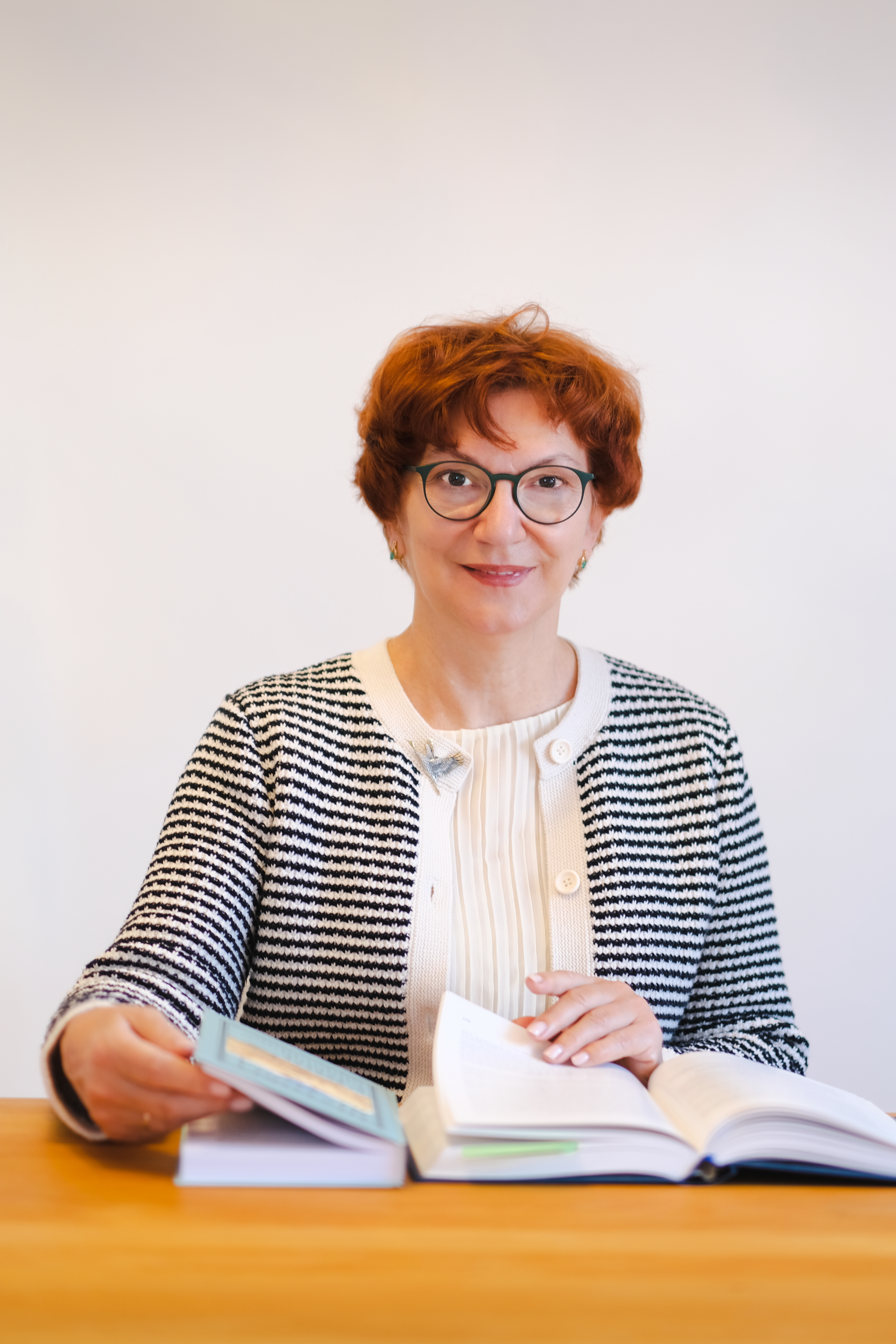
- Born: September 2, 1965 (age 61); Kazan, Soviet Union
- Citizenship: Russia
- Education: Kazan State University (1988)
- Alma mater: Kazan State University
- Occupation: Historian
- Years active: 1992–present
- Employer: LMU Munich
- Known for: History of medicine, history of Russian universities, visual studies
- Notable work: Visual Ethnography of the Russian Empire (2011); Russian Professors (2012); "Clubs" and "Ghettos" of Soviet Healthcare (2022)
- Title: Professor
- Awards: Gratitude of the Ministry of Education and Science of the Russian Federation
- Website: orcid.org/0000-0002-9471-0091

Elena Vishlenkova (born September 2, 1965, Kazan) is a Russian historian, Doctor of Historical Sciences (1999), Professor (2000).

== Biography ==
Vishlenkova graduated in 1988 from the Faculty of History at Kazan State University.

After defending her Candidate of Sciences dissertation, A. P. Shchapov's Concept of the Church Schism (1992; advisor: G. N. Wulfson), she worked at the Department of Russian History before the 20th Century at Kazan State University until 2009, serving as assistant (1992–1996), associate professor (1996–1998) and, after defending her doctoral dissertation, Religious Policy in Russia (First Quarter of the 19th Century), in 1999, as Professor and Head of the same department (1999–2009)..

From 2009 to 2022, she was a chief research fellow, and from 2010 to 2018 deputy director, at the Poletaev Institute for Theoretical and Historical Studies in the Humanities (IGITI) at the National Research University Higher School of Economics (HSE). Concurrently, she was a Professor at the Faculty of History (since 2012, the School of History) at HSE. In 2012, she founded and led the Center for University Studies and, in 2019, the Center for the History of Medicine at IGITI.

Since 2022, she has been a Senior Fellow at the Research Institute of the Deutsches Museum in Munich and at the Freiburg Institute for Advanced Studies (FRIAS) and, since 2023, a visiting Professor at LMU Munich

Since 2008, she has served as Russia's representative on the International Commission for the History of Universities. She co-organized All-Russian summer schools in Kazan (2000–2004, with Svetlana Yu. Malysheva and Alexandra G. Supriyanovich) and co-led international research projects (2010–2012 with Andrey Yu. Andreev and Sergey I. Posokhov, Gerda Henkel Foundation; 2019–2021 with Andreas A. Renner, Russian Science Foundation and the German Research Foundation).

== Academic work ==
In the 1990s, Vishlenkova worked on confessional politics in Russia during the first quarter of the 19th century as a means of producing bureaucratic knowledge about the diversity of the Russian Empire, and analyzed the attempts by Alexander I’s government to stabilize the empire through the ideology of “supranational” imperial loyalty— “non-confessional” Christianity.

From 2000 to 2017, her primary research focus was the history of universities in Russia. She developed and tested a new methodological approach that studies universities not only as state institutions but also as communities governed by cultural norms regulating relationships among their members.

In her monograph Visual Ethnography, or Not Everyone Is Given to See the Russian, Vishlenkova demonstrated how visual media were used by intellectual elites to construct national solidarity. The book and related articles generated extensive scholarly discussion on the specificity of the visual language of "Russianness."

Since the 2010s, she has researched the history of medicine. She reconstructed the formation of the medical profession in Russia in the first half of the 19th century, examining mechanisms of professional self-organization and self-regulation through academic certification and peer review.

In the joint 2021 book The History of Medicine and Medical Geography of the Russian Empire, she analyzed how the immense size of the empire affected the study of public health. Drawing on medical-topographical descriptions, statistical data on morbidity and mortality, and archival materials from ministerial medical councils, the authors demonstrated how a specifically Russian model of the medical profession emerged, characterized by physicians' deep involvement in the state administration and their expertise in environmental and sanitary conditions.

With Professor S. N. Zatravkin, she studied the history of public health and healthcare in the Soviet Union; the results were published in 2022 in the book "Clubs" and "Ghettos" of Soviet Healthcare.

From 2020 to 2025, she, Zatravkin and Fezodor Genin conducted a project on the historicization and development of the Russian pharmaceutical market. The study identified key trajectories in the pharmaceutical market's development. The authors analyzed formal and informal rules governing the market, the conditions of their formation and revision, the specifics of Russian entrepreneurial culture, the system of pharmaceutical information production, and social representations of the pharmaceutical business. The results were published in a series of articles and in the book Playing One's Own Game: The History of the Pharmaceutical Market in Russia.

== Reception ==
Peter Hartmut Rüdiger, a Professor at the University of Halle, described Vishlenkova's approach in Terra Universitatis as a form of "cultural history".

Elena Gapova, a Professor at the University of Michigan, noted the originality of Vishlenkova's approach in her discussion of the collective monograph Russian Professors, stating:

The authors proposed a productive model of analysis. Drawing on documents, they move beyond mere description and retelling and instead conceptualize them in terms of 'autonomy,' 'solidarity,' 'group interests,' and 'control'—concepts characteristic of the contemporary sociology of knowledge.

Historian of science Michael Gordin at Princeton University, reviewing the collective monographs Russian Professors and The Estate of Russian Professors, noted that they "provide in their kaleidoscopic fragmentation a set of alternative perspectives to writing the history of the 'Russian university' in a manner cognizant of the past historical tradition without replicating it. The cure for Sonderweg fever is precisely a healthy dose of reflexivity."

Ksenia Kazakova, reviewing Biographies of University Archives, emphasized that "the novelty of the study lies in the attempt to show that the archive is not only an object of research but also an active subject of university history," functioning as "a complex of collective autobiographies and testimonies produced by the scholarly community in its interaction with authorities and society".

Olga Kochukova, associate professor at Saratov State University, wrote of Vishlenkova's monograph Visual Ethnography:

E. A. Vishlenkova's monograph significantly enriches contemporary historical scholarship, expanding its research agenda… As a result of applying new research practices and technologies in the humanities, it can serve as an excellent practical guide to modern historical methodology.

Commenting on The History of Medicine and Medical Geography of the Russian Empire, Alexander Martin, an American historian of the Russian Empire at the University of Notre Dame, wrote:

By systematically placing Russia within the comparative framework of European empires, and combining attention to capital cities with the study of the empire's peripheries, the authors show how medical geography and its everyday practices both connected Russia to Europe and contributed to the formation of imperial statehood, the Russian nation, and an emerging civil society.

Regarding "Clubs" and "Ghettos" of Soviet Healthcare, Professor Vladimir Borodulin wrote that its publication "allows one to draw a line under the discussion of a more specific issue: what 'Soviet history of medicine' is as a scientific discipline". Professor Pavel Ratmanov noted that "the book delivers a powerful blow to the myth of the many virtues, achievements, progressiveness, flawlessness, and humanism of Soviet healthcare". This view was supported by Professor Sergey Glyantsev, who nevertheless criticized the authors for not addressing "medical care in the clinics of Soviet medical universities and academic research institutes… nor the role of scientific schools in laying the foundations for the development of Russian medicine in the late 20th and early 21st centuries". Professor Vsevolod Bashkuev described the book as "a long-awaited top-quality critical enquiry into the history of Soviet healthcare," anticipating it to "mark a watershed between historiographical traditions: between the history of Soviet healthcare as a heroic epic and the objective deconstruction of Soviet medical practices down to their deepest and most disguised subtexts".

In 2026, the book Playing by Its Own Rules: A History of the Pharmaceutical Market in Russia received the "Platinum Ounce" award at the Russian national competition for professionals in the pharmaceutical industry.

== Selected works ==
- Vishlenkova, E. A. (1997). Religious Policy: The Official Course and 'Public Opinion' in Russia of the Alexandrine Era. Kazan: Izd-vo KGU. p. 189. ISBN 5-7464-1238-4.
- Vishlenkova, E. A. (1998). The Theological School in Russia in the First Quarter of the 19th Century. Kazan: Izd-vo KGU. p. 184. ISBN 5-7464-1272-4.
- Vishlenkova, E. A. (2002). Caring for the Souls of Subjects: Religious Policy in Russia in the First Quarter of the 19th Century. Saratov: Izd-vo SGU. p. 467. ISBN 5-292-03001-5.
- Vishlenkova, E. A. (2003). Kazan University of the Alexandrine Era: An Album of Several Portraits. Kazan: Izd-vo KGU. p. 248. ISBN 5-7464-0490-X.
- Vishlenkova, E. A.; Malysheva, S. Yu.; Salnikova, A. A. (2005). Terra Universitatis: Two Centuries of University Culture in Kazan. Kazan: Izd-vo KGU. p. 498. ISBN 5-98180-197-2.
- Vishlenkova, E. A.; Malysheva, S. Yu.; Salnikova, A. A. (2009). The Culture of Everyday Life in a Provincial City: Kazan and Its Residents (19th–20th Centuries). Kazan: Izd-vo KGU. p. 451. ISBN 978-5-98180-622-3.
- Vishlenkova, E. A. (2011). Visual Ethnography of the Russian Empire, or Not Everyone Is Given to See the Russian. Moscow: Novoe literaturnoe obozrenie. p. 381. ISBN 978-5-86793-862-8.
- Vishlenkova, E. A.; Galiullina, R. Kh.; Ilina, K. A. (2012). Russian Professors: University Corporatism or Professional Solidarity. Moscow: Novoe literaturnoe obozrenie. p. 648. ISBN 978-5-86793-945-8.
- Vishlenkova, E. A.; Sdvizhkov, L., eds. (2013). Inventing the Century: Problems and Models of Time in Russia and Europe in the 19th Century. Moscow: Novoe literaturnoe obozrenie. p. 360. ISBN 978-5-4448-0120-8.
- Vishlenkova, E. A.; Savelyeva, I. M., eds. (2013). The Estate of Russian Professors: Creators of Statuses and Meanings. Moscow: HSE Publishing House. p. 385. ISBN 978-5-7598-1046-9.
- Vishlenkova, E. A.; Ilina, K. A.; Parsamov, V. S., eds. (2017). Biographies of University Archives. Moscow: HSE Publishing House. p. 297. ISBN 978-5-7598-1587-7.
- Vishlenkova, E. A.; Renner, A., eds. (2021). The History of Medicine and Medical Geography of the Russian Empire. Moscow: Shiko. p. 388.
- Zatravkin, S. N.; Vishlenkova, E. A. (2022). "Clubs" and "Ghettos" of Soviet Healthcare. Moscow: Shiko. p. 352. ISBN 978-5-907348-26-4.
- Zatravkin, S. N.; Vishlenkova, E. A.; Genin, F. V. (2025). Playing One's Own Game: The History of the Pharmaceutical Market in Russia. Moscow: Shiko. p. 480. ISBN 978-5-907348-42-4.
