= Klaus Palme =

German plant biologist (born 1951)

- Born: 31 October 1951 (age 74)
- Education: University of Ulm; University of Freiburg
- Occupations: Biologist; physiologist; academic
- Known for: Plant signalling and hormone biology
- Awards: Max Planck Research Award (2002); Academia Europaea (1993); European Molecular Biology Organization (2000); Lisbon Academy of Sciences (2015)
- Scientific career
- Fields: Plant biology; molecular physiology
- Workplaces: University of Freiburg; Swedish University of Agricultural Sciences; University of Cologne (1984–1985); Salk Institute for Biological Studies (1982–1983)

Klaus Palme (born 31 October 1951) is a German plant biologist and molecular physiologist associated with the University of Freiburg. His research has focused on plant signalling and hormone biology, particularly auxin signalling and transport. He received the Max Planck Research Award for International Cooperation (2002) and was elected to the Academia Europaea and the European Molecular Biology Organization (EMBO).

== Biography ==
Palme received a Diploma in Chemistry from the University of Ulm (1977) and a PhD in Biochemistry from the University of Freiburg (1981). Palme is associated with the University of Freiburg and interdisciplinary research programmes there, including the Freiburg Institute for Advanced Studies (FRIAS). His academic appointments include a professorship at Freiburg, a professorship in plant biotechnology at the Swedish University of Agricultural Sciences (Umeå), and leadership of an independent research group at the Max Delbrück Laboratory in Cologne (Max Planck Society).

Palme undertook his postdoctoral training at the Salk Institute for Biological Studies (1982 to 1983) and subsequently at the University of Cologne (1984 to 1985).

Palme has been awarded the Max Planck Research Award for his research on the mechanism of action of auxin, a plant growth factor involved in plant development and morphogenesis. The BIOSS (University of Freiburg) highlights selected publications that are also associated to his work in auxin transport and signalling.

He has also given lectures internationally, including at universities in China.

As of January 2026, Palme had an h-index of 92.

=== Entrepreneurship ===
Palme founded ScreenSYS GmbH in 2016 and currently serves as its Chief Scientific Officer. The Innovations and Start-Up Centre for Biotechnology (IZB) and the KliwiResse project describe ScreenSYS as drawing on research conducted by Palme at the University of Freiburg. During his tenure at ScreenSys, Palme has worked to accelerate tomato breeding, and participated on EpiHAP project, amongst other projects.

== Honours and awards ==
Palme received the Max Planck Research Award for International Cooperation (2002). The Academia Europaea profile lists additional distinctions including the DAGM Award (2006), the G-Prize (1995), and a scholarship from the German National Merit Foundation (Cusanuswerk) (1974 to 1977); it also records his election as a member to the Academia Europaea (1993) and as an EMBO member (2000). The Lisbon Academy of Sciences lists his election to the Lisbon Academy of Sciences (2015).

== Selected works ==
The following publications are listed as selected works on the BIOSS profile for Palme.

- Blilou, I.; Wildwater, M.; Willemsen, V.; Paponov, I.; Friml, J.; Heidstra, R.; Palme, K.; Scheres, B. (2005). "The PIN auxin efflux facilitator network controls patterning and cell division in Arabidopsis roots". Nature. 433: 39–44.
- Friml, J.; Yang, X.; Michniewicz, M.; Weijers, D.; Quint, A.; Tietz, O.; Benjamins, R.; Ouwerkerk, P. B. F.; Ljung, K.; Sandberg, G.; Hooykaas, P. J. J.; Palme, K.; Offringa, R. (2004). "A PINOID-dependent binary switch in apical-basal PIN polar targeting directs auxin efflux". Science. 306: 862–865.
- Friml, J.; Benková, E.; Blilou, I.; Wisniewska, J.; Hamann, T.; Ljung, K.; Sandberg, G.; Scheres, B.; Jürgens, G.; Palme, K. (2002). "AtPIN4 mediates sink-driven auxin gradients and root patterning in Arabidopsis". Cell. 108: 661–673.
- Geldner, N.; Friml, J.; Stierhof, Y.-D.; Jürgens, G.; Palme, K. (2001). "Reversible regulation of polar insertion of AtPIN1". Nature. 413: 425–428.
- Ottenschläger, I.; Wolff, P.; Wolverton, C.; Bhalerao, R.; Sandberg, G.; Ishikawa, H.; Evans, M.; Palme, K. (2003). "Gravity-induced auxin transport from Arabidopsis columella cells to lateral root cap cells". Proceedings of the National Academy of Sciences of the United States of America. 100: 2987–2991.
- Steinmann, T.; Geldner, N.; Grebe, M.; Mangold, S.; Jackson, C.; Paris, S.; Gälweiler, L.; Palme, K.; Jürgens, G. (1999). "Coordinated polar localization of auxin efflux carrier PIN1 by GNOM ARF GEF". Science. 286: 316–318.
