= Golden rice =

Variety of genetically modified rice

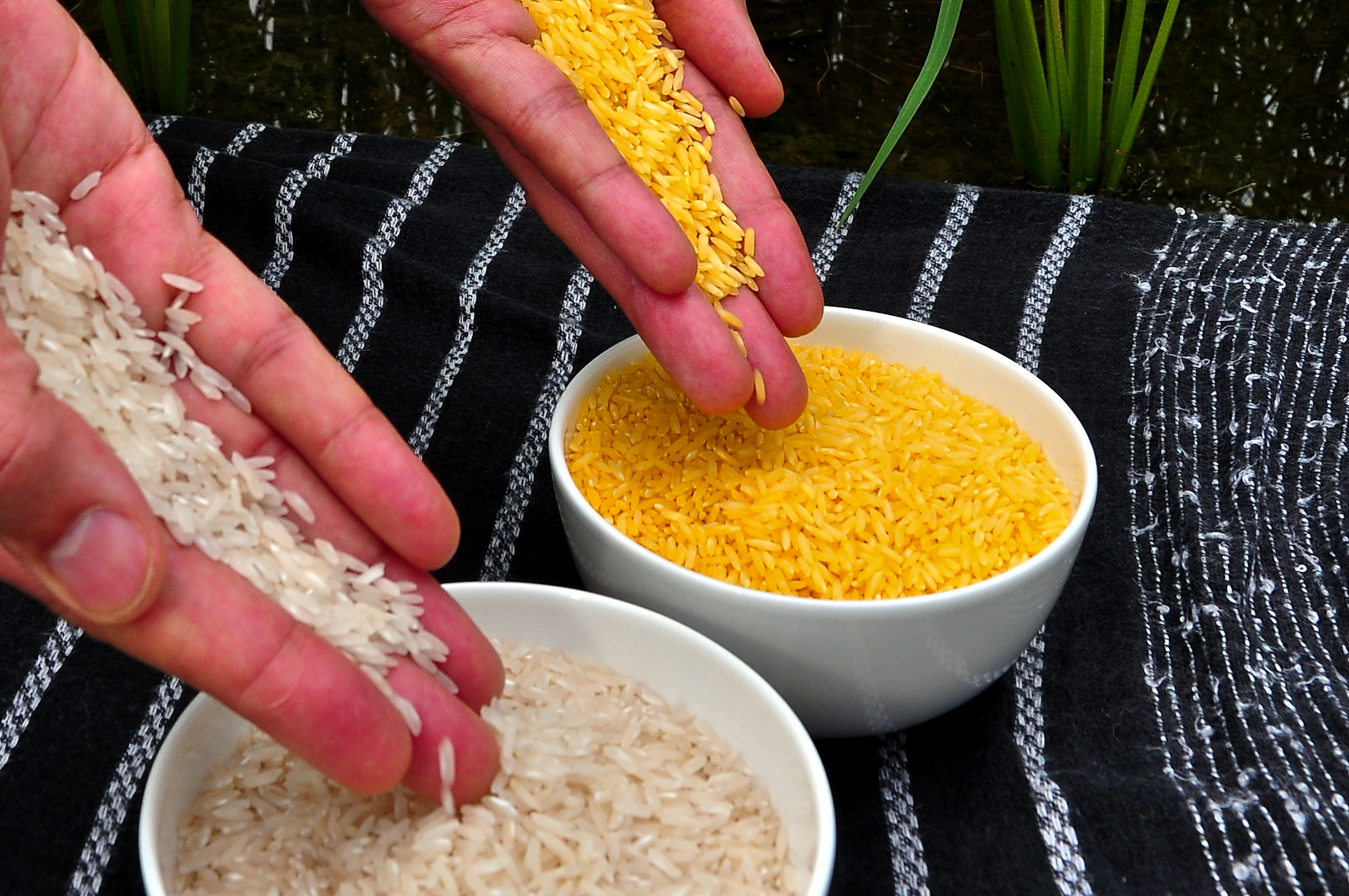
- Golden rice (right) compared to white rice (left), demonstrating the distinctive golden-yellow colour of the variety
- Species: Oryza sativa
- Cultivar: Golden rice
- Origin: Rockefeller Foundation

Golden rice is a variety of rice (Oryza sativa) produced through genetic engineering to biosynthesize beta-carotene, a precursor of vitamin A, in the edible parts of the rice. It is intended to produce a fortified food to be grown and consumed in areas with a shortage of dietary vitamin A. Genetically modified golden rice can produce up to 23 times as much beta-carotene as the original golden rice.

Golden rice is generally considered to be safe, with the FDA, Health Canada, International Rice Research Institute and the Bill & Melinda Gates Foundation supporting its use. It has been met with significant opposition from some environmental and anti-globalisation activists, alleging risks regarding biodiversity and expressing concerns about unforeseen health effects and socioeconomic impacts. In 2016, 107 Nobel laureates wrote an open letter to Greenpeace and its supporters, asking them to abandon their campaign against genetically modified crops in general and golden rice in particular. In 2024, following advocacy by Greenpeace, the Filipino Court of Appeals issued a cease and desist order for the growth of golden rice in the country, citing a lack of scientific certainty regarding its health and environmental impact.

== History ==
A simplified overview of the carotenoid biosynthesis pathway in golden rice. The enzymes expressed in the endosperm of golden rice, shown in red, catalyse the biosyntheis of beta-carotene from geranylgeranyl diphosphate. Beta-carotene is assumed to be converted to retinal and subsequently retinol (vitamin A) in the animal gut.

Research for development of golden rice began as a Rockefeller Foundation initiative in 1982.

In the 1990s, Peter Bramley discovered that the phytoene desaturase gene (bacterial CrtI) can be used to produce lycopene from phytoene in GM tomato, rather than having to introduce multiple carotene desaturases that are normally used by higher plants. Lycopene is then cyclized to beta-carotene by the endogenous cyclase in golden rice. The scientific details of the rice were first published in 2000, the product of an eight-year project by Ingo Potrykus of the Swiss Federal Institute of Technology and Peter Beyer of the University of Freiburg.

The first field trials of golden rice cultivars were conducted by Louisiana State University Agricultural Center in 2004. Additional trials were conducted in the Philippines, Taiwan, and in Bangladesh (2015). Field testing provided an accurate measurement of nutritional value and enabled feeding tests to be performed. Preliminary results from field tests showed field-grown golden rice produces 4 to 5 times more beta-carotene than golden rice grown under greenhouse conditions.

=== Approvals ===
In 2018, Canada and the United States approved golden rice, with Health Canada and the US Food and Drug Administration (FDA) declaring it safe for consumption. This followed a 2016 decision where the FDA had ruled that the beta-carotene content in golden rice did not provide sufficient amounts of vitamin A for US markets. Health Canada declared that golden rice would not affect allergies, and that the nutrient contents were the same as in common rice varieties, except for the intended high levels of provitamin A.

In 2019, golden rice was approved for use as human food and animal feed or for processing in the Philippines. On 21 July 2021, the Philippines became the first country to officially issue the biosafety permit for commercially propagating vitamin A-infused golden rice. The approval came as the first commercial propagation authorisation of genetically engineered rice in South and Southeast Asia. As a result of the permission, golden rice can be grown on a commercial scale in accordance with the terms and conditions specified by the Philippines government. In April 2023, however, the country's Supreme Court ordered the agriculture department to stop commercial propagation of golden rice in relation to a petition filed by MASIPAG (a group of farmers and scientists), who claimed that golden rice poses risk to the health of consumers and to the environment. This Writ of Kalikasan was upheld by the Court of Appeals in April 2024.

=== Opposition ===
On 17 April 2024, the Court of Appeals in the Philippines issued a cease-and-desist order on the commercial propagation of golden rice as a genetically modified crop, citing a lack of "full scientific certainty" regarding its health and environmental impact. The decision was in response to a petition filed by Greenpeace Southeast Asia and other groups, resulting in the court revoking the biosafety permits previously granted by the government to the University of the Philippines Los Baños and the Philippine Rice Research Institute. The court stated there was an absence of scientific consensus about the safety of golden rice, and therefore it should not be commercially cultivated. This decision was criticized for putting the lives of thousands of children at risk.

Golden rice developers have acknowledged that diet supplement programs have already reduced rates of vitamin A deficiency in the Philippines. To more widely impact diets of children deficient in vitamin A, the golden rice would have to be grown regionally by commercial farmers, who would need special inducements to continue growing it.

== Genetics ==
Golden rice was created by transforming rice with two beta-carotene biosynthesis genes:

1. psy (phytoene synthase) from daffodil (Narcissus pseudonarcissus)
2. crtI (phytoene desaturase) from the soil bacterium Erwinia uredovora

(The insertion of a lcy (lycopene cyclase) gene was thought to be needed, but further research showed it is already produced in wild-type rice endosperm.)

The psy and crtI genes were transferred into the rice nuclear genome and placed under the control of an endosperm-specific promoter, so that they are only expressed in the endosperm. The exogenous lcy gene has a transit peptide sequence attached, so it is targeted to the plastid, where geranylgeranyl diphosphate is formed. The bacterial crtI gene was an important inclusion to complete the pathway, since it can catalyse multiple steps in the synthesis of carotenoids up to lycopene, while these steps require more than one enzyme in plants. The end product of the engineered pathway is lycopene, but if the plant accumulated lycopene, the rice would be red. Recent analysis has shown the plant's endogenous enzymes process the lycopene to beta-carotene in the endosperm, giving the rice the distinctive yellow colour for which it is named. The original golden rice was called SGR1, and under greenhouse conditions it produced 1.6 μg/g of carotenoids.

=== Golden Rice 2 ===
In 2005, a team of researchers at Syngenta produced Golden Rice 2. They combined the phytoene synthase (psy) gene from maize with crtl gene from the original golden rice. Golden Rice 2 produces 23 times more carotenoids than golden rice (up to 37 μg/g) because psy gene of maize is the most effective gene for carotenoid synthesis, and preferentially accumulates beta-carotene (up to 31 μg/g of the 37 μg/g of carotenoids).

== Vitamin A deficiency ==
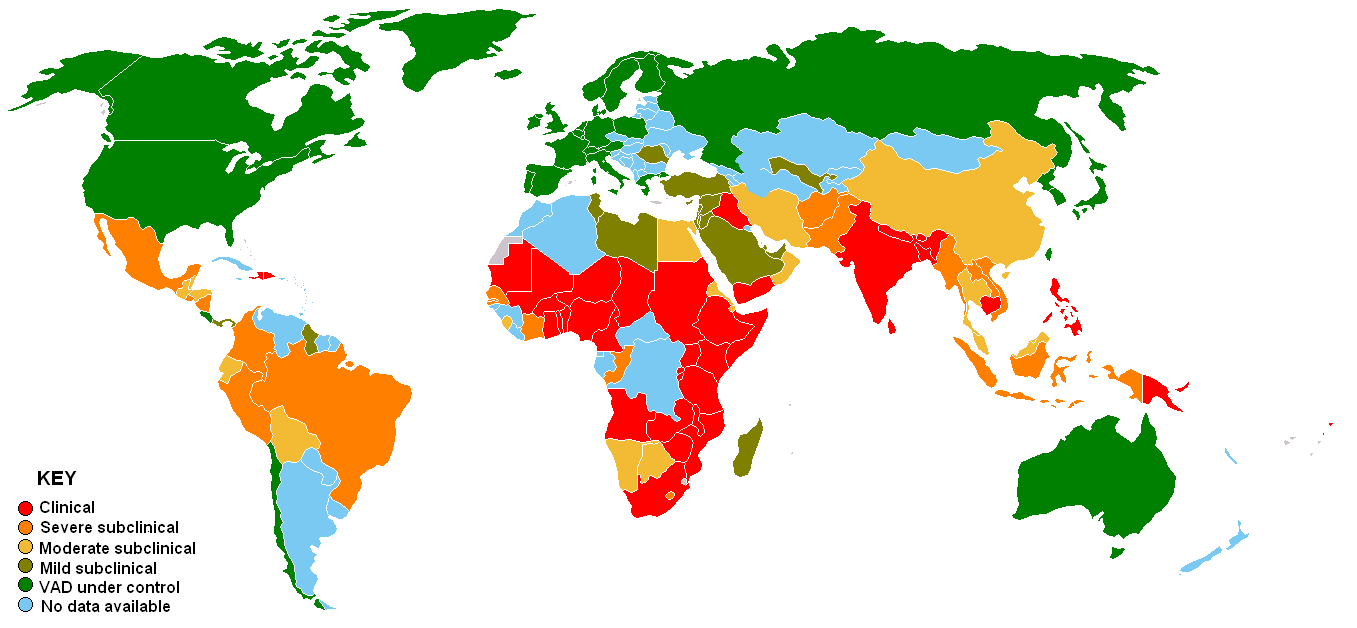
Prevalence of vitamin A deficiency. Red is most severe (clinical), green least severe. Countries not reporting data are coded blue. Data collected for a 1995 report.

The research that led to golden rice was conducted with the goal of helping children who suffer from vitamin A deficiency (VAD). Estimates show that around 1.02 billion people are severely affected by micronutrient deficiencies globally, with vitamin A to be the most deficient nutrient in the body.

Vitamin A supplementation (VAS) programs began in the 1990s in response to evidence demonstrating the association between VAD and increased childhood mortality. Between 1990 and 2013, more than 40 efficacy studies of VAS in children 6–59 months of age were conducted, and two systematic reviews and meta-analyses have concluded that VA supplements can considerably reduce mortality and morbidity during childhood. As of 2017, more than 80 countries worldwide are implementing universal VAS programs targeted to children 6–59 months of age through semi-annual national campaigns. However, UNICEF and a number of NGOs involved in supplementation note more frequent low-dose supplementation is preferable.

As many children in VAD-affected countries rely on rice as a staple food, genetic modification to make rice produce the vitamin A precursor beta-carotene was seen as a simple and less expensive alternative to ongoing vitamin supplements or an increase in the consumption of green vegetables or animal products. Initial analyses of the potential nutritional benefits of golden rice suggested consumption of golden rice would not eliminate the problems of vitamin A deficiency, but could complement other supplementation. Golden Rice 2 contains sufficient provitamin A to provide the entire dietary requirement via daily consumption of some 75 grams (3 oz) per day.

Vitamin A deficiency is usually coupled to an unbalanced diet. Since carotenes are hydrophobic, sufficient fat must be present in the diet for golden rice (or most other vitamin A supplements) to alleviate vitamin A deficiency. Moreover, this claim referred to an early cultivar of golden rice; one bowl of the latest version provides 60% of Recommended Dietary Allowance (RDA) for healthy children. The RDA levels advocated in developed countries are far in excess of the amounts needed to prevent blindness.

== Research ==
In 2009, results of a clinical trial of golden rice with healthy adult volunteers concluded that "beta-carotene derived from golden rice is effectively converted to vitamin A in humans", although however to date no research has been conducted on the target population of severely undernourished children. A summary for the American Society for Nutrition suggested that "Golden Rice could probably supply 50% of the RDA of vitamin A from a very modest amount – perhaps a cup – of rice, if consumed daily. This amount is well within the consumption habits of most young children and their mothers." Beta-carotene is found and consumed in many nutritious foods eaten around the world, including fruits and vegetables. Beta-carotene in food is a safe source of vitamin A.

A 2012 study showed that the beta-carotene produced by golden rice is as effective as beta-carotene in oil at providing vitamin A to children. The study stated that "recruitment processes and protocol were approved". However, in 2015, the journal retracted the study, claiming that the researchers had acted unethically when providing Chinese children golden rice without their parents' consent.

Golden rice improves vitamin A intake and may reduce vitamin A deficiency among women and children. Food derived from golden rice varieties is as safe as food derived from conventional rice varieties.

== Controversy ==
Critics of genetically engineered crops have raised various concerns. An early issue was that golden rice originally did not have sufficient beta-carotene content. This problem was solved by the advancing of GR2E event. The speed at which beta-carotene degrades once the rice is harvested, and how much remains after cooking are contested. A 2009 study concluded that beta-carotene from golden rice is effectively converted into vitamin A in healthy adults; however to date no research has been conducted on the target population of severely undernourished children.

Greenpeace opposes the use of any patented genetically modified organisms in agriculture and opposes the cultivation of golden rice, claiming it will open the door to more widespread use of GMOs. The International Rice Research Institute (IRRI) has emphasised the non-commercial nature of their project, stating that "None of the companies listed ... are involved in carrying out the research and development activities of IRRI or its partners in Golden Rice, and none of them will receive any royalty or payment from the marketing or selling of golden rice varieties developed by IRRI."

Vandana Shiva, an Indian anti-GMO activist, argued the problem was not the plant per se, but potential issues with loss of biodiversity. Shiva argued that golden rice proponents were obscuring the limited availability of diverse and nutritionally adequate food. Other groups argued that a varied diet containing foods rich in beta-carotene such as sweet potato, leaf vegetables and fruit would provide children with sufficient vitamin A. However, Keith West of Johns Hopkins Bloomberg School of Public Health has said that foodstuffs containing vitamin A are often unavailable, only available in certain seasons, or are too expensive for poor families to obtain.

In 2008, WHO malnutrition expert Francesco Branca cited the lack of real-world studies and uncertainty about how many people will use golden rice, concluding "giving out supplements, fortifying existing foods with vitamin A, and teaching people to grow carrots or certain leafy vegetables are, for now, more promising ways to fight the problem". Author Michael Pollan, who had criticized the product in 2001, being unimpressed by the benefits, expressed support for the continuation of the research in 2013.

In 2012, controversy surrounded a study published in The American Journal of Clinical Nutrition. The study, involving feeding GM rice to children from 6 to 8 years old in China, was later found to have violated human research rules of both Tufts University and the federal government. Subsequent reviews found no evidence of safety problems with the study, but found issues with insufficient consent forms, unapproved changes to study protocol, and lack of approval from a China-based ethics review board. Additionally, the GM rice used was brought into China illegally.

=== Support ===
The Bill and Melinda Gates Foundation supports the use of genetically modified organisms in agricultural development and supports the International Rice Research Institute in developing golden rice. In June 2016, 107 Nobel laureates wrote an open letter to Greenpeace and its supporters, asking it "to abandon their campaign against 'GMOs' in general and Golden Rice in particular".

In May 2018, the U.S. Food and Drug Administration approved the use of golden rice for human consumption, stating: "Based on the information IRRI has presented to FDA, we have no further questions concerning human or animal food derived from GR2E rice at this time." This marks the fourth national health organisation to approve the use of golden rice in 2018, joining Australia, Canada and New Zealand who issued their assessments earlier in the year.

In December 2021, an opinion piece in Proceedings of the National Academy of Sciences of the United States of America called on regulators to "allow Golden Rice to save lives", which the authors say has been delayed due to "fear and false accusations", leading to estimated 266,000 lives lost per year due to vitamin A deficiency.

=== Protests ===
On August 8, 2013, an experimental plot of golden rice being developed by IRRI and DA-PhilRice in Camarines Sur province of the Philippines was uprooted by protesters. British author Mark Lynas reported in Slate that the vandalism was carried out by a group of activists led by Kilusang Magbubukid ng Pilipinas (KMP) (literally 'Farmers' Movement of the Philippines').

== Distribution ==
A recommendation was made that golden rice be distributed free to subsistence farmers. Free licenses for developing countries were granted quickly due to the positive publicity that golden rice received, particularly in Time magazine in July 2000. Monsanto Company was one of the companies to grant free licences for related patents owned by the company. The cutoff between humanitarian and commercial use was set at US$10,000. Therefore, as long as a farmer or subsequent user of golden rice genetics would not make more than $10,000 per year, no royalties would need to be paid. In addition, farmers would be permitted to keep and replant seed.

== See also ==
- Artificial rice - grain product made to resemble rice, often made from broken rice and vitamin-fortified.
