= Utah Minute Women =

The Utah Minute Women was a group of volunteer women who collected material rations to help the war efforts during World War II. The Minute Women were a part of the Volunteer Salvage Corps, which was under the War Production Board, and had a group of volunteers in most states. The Utah Minute Women were specifically located in the Salt Lake area of Utah. The materials they collected included nylon, silk, scrap metals, deer and elk fat from local hunters, and tin cans from local grocery stores. Reminiscent of the American Revolutionary Minute Men, these women called themselves Minute Women, because they were ready at any notice to carry information about war jobs, gather materials for the war effort, and to contribute in any way possible to the American war effort.

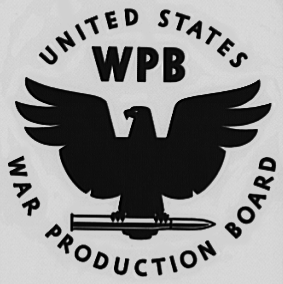
Logo for the United States War Production Board

Utah was the first state to gather all the Minute Women to complete the organization. Over 8,000 women participated in the Utah Minute Women program in some way between 1942 and 1946. The Utah Minute Women were in charge of all salvaging efforts including collecting the materials, organizing meetings, and organizing the transportation of those materials. They also held bond and scrap metal collection drives. These women used local newspapers, radio, and door-to-door contacting to persuade people to salvage.

== Collections ==
=== Items collected ===
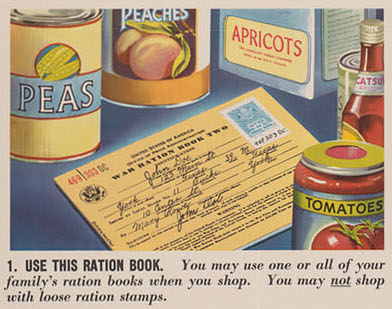
Example of a Ration Book to help enforce rationing

These women had a list of ninety-three different items people could donate that would help with the war effort. The most popular items collected were silk, nylon, fats, tin, and scrap metals. Some even donated books to hospitals for soldiers and prisoners of war to read and planted trees around newly constructed hospitals. The Utah Minute Women were most successful at collecting scrap metals when they held drives where people could come to them to donate the items. Utah dry cleaners also volunteered to help in these efforts by washing the donated clothing. These Minute Women was so successful because they divided up Salt Lake City in eight areas, each led by an assigned member of the group. The leading women would be able to go door to door asking their neighbors for any rations they could collect. The system also allowed the leaders of each area to have continuous contact with those they lived near. This was a person-to-person approach that helped connect the women in the Salt Lake City area and encouraged everyone to help out with the war effort. Women all over the state did whatever they could to help their state and their country, from donations to working to planting trees and much more.

=== Effectiveness ===
The Utah Minute Women organization was very successful, exceeding collection quotas for a few different months. A newspaper article from the Roosevelt Standard stated that Utah had exceeded its fat quotas in both January and February. They collected 88,943 pounds of fat when the quota was 76,667 pounds. The article also mentioned that everyone in the state was doing their part to collect needed rations, including the small communities living in the rural areas of Utah. Additionally, the impact of introducing women in the workforce through employment and aggressive rationing provided a long-lasting change in the way women were perceived and treated in society well past World War II.

== Rations ==
Rationing meant giving up some food or materials so that they could be used to make military items or feed soldiers. Women had to make small sacrifices in order to donate their silk and nylon materials. Silk and nylon were commonly used in stockings that were worn frequently under women's dresses and skirts. When women donated these items, they painted their legs to make it look like they were wearing stockings so that they could continue following the fashion trends, but also help in the war effort. Frugality and resourcefulness became the prevailing mental mindset for women in Utah. Jessie L. Embry, a child growing up in Utah during this time period, recounts her experiences with the following: "When my father had his steers slaughtered in the fall, my mother had him bring home the fat which she made into soap. She reused boxes, paper, paper towels, and scraps of cloth. She saved old nylons with runs in them. Very little trash went out of our home because everything was used two or three times."

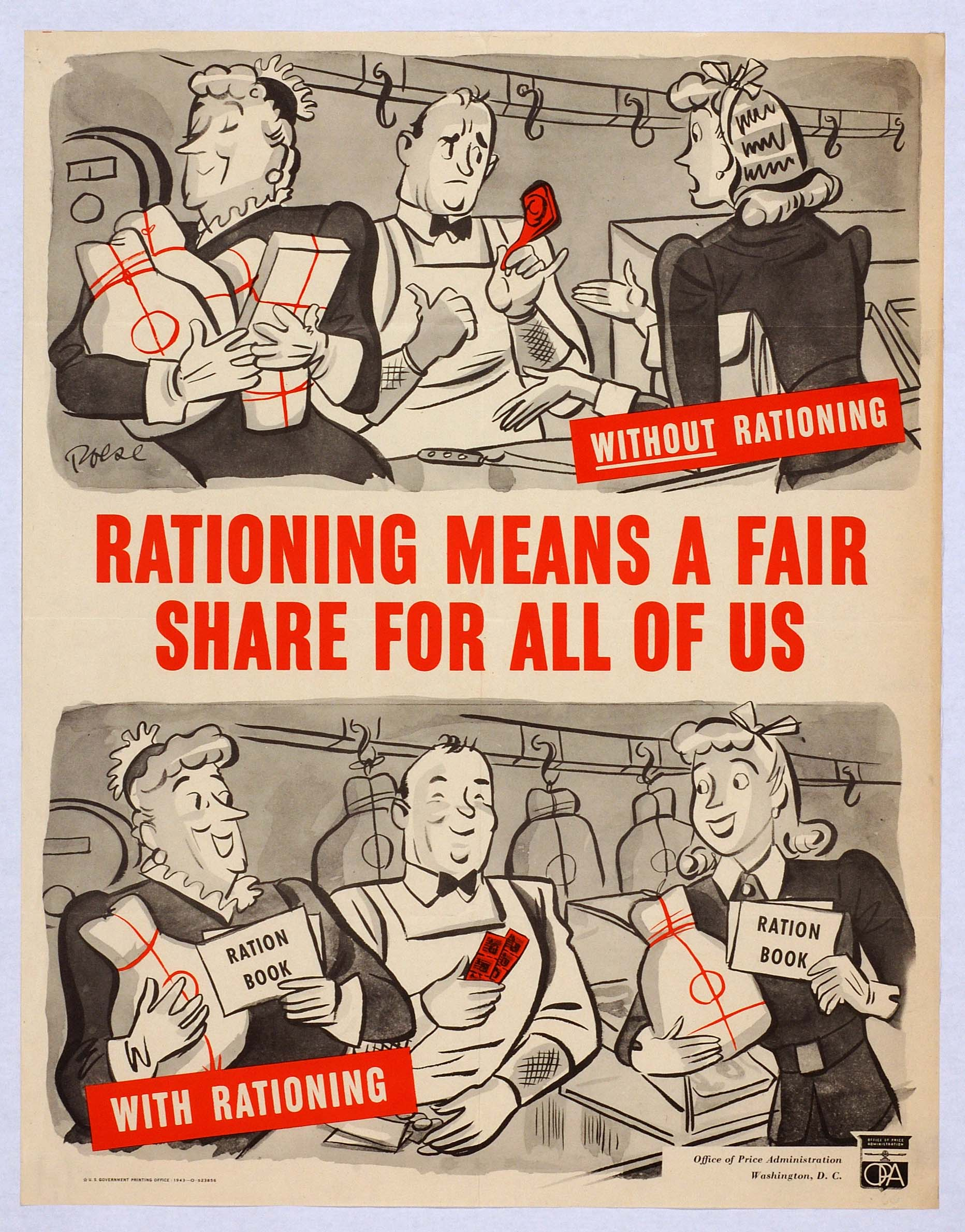
A rationing advertisement

=== Main contributors ===
Women were typically the people who rationed the most. The media specifically targeted women who were living at home to encourage rationing because they were the ones who typically prepared meals. Because they cooked, it was the women's responsibility to change up their family's diet and eating patterns in order to sacrifice some foods to give as rations. Women in the kitchen were seen as patriotic role models for saving foods and other items. Jessie L. Embry gives one example of how women were strongly encouraged to change up their eating patterns with the following: "I also remember my mother's favorite cookbook was a World War II Victory edition containing a section for cooking low-grade cuts of meat and making desserts without sugar." Rationing was an expectation held to all women; the Utah Minute Women helped organize this effort by gathering needed supplies, as well as encouraging women to stop buying things such as silk and nylon tights.

=== Use of rations in the war effort ===
One of the rations highly collected by the Utah Minute Women was fat. Fat collections were important because it was used to make bombs for the war. Fat produces a chemical called glycerin which was used to make explosives, lubricants, antifreeze, and medicine. Glycerin was so important for the war effort that it was limited in toothpaste, gum, and cosmetics. Silk, another ration collected, was used to make gunpowder bags and parachutes for soldiers in the field. Tin was used for circuits, machine gun mounts, gas masks, and chemical compounds. Tin was also used to make containers for ammunition, blood plasma, food, and medical drugs so the soldiers could carry these things with them. In addition, each soldier carried a tin tube that held a pain killing drug called Syrette. This drug would potentially save a wounded soldier's life as it was to be used while he waited for medical help to arrive, therefore reducing the shock of the injury.

== Other activities ==
The classic Rosie the Riveter advertisement

In addition to collecting rations and holding scrap metal collecting drives, the Utah Minute Women also took on the responsibility of encouraging women to work outside the home. They would telephone house to house to find women to join the work force. By 1944, women, nicknamed Utah's Rosies, made up to thirty-seven percent of the total Utah Workforce, from administrative positions such as secretaries and clerks to industrial factory workers such as mechanics and manufacturers.

One particularly large contribution was through the Manti Parachute factory. Women were encouraged to collect silk and nylon to help produce much needed parachutes for the war effort. Women used their skills in gathering and working to produce a large number of parachutes throughout the war, this being just one example of their many contributions. Women learned to balance the demands of child rearing and home making with production and military contributions that paved the way for a more involved women workforce throughout the twentieth century.
