= PATH (global health organization) =

Global health nonprofit

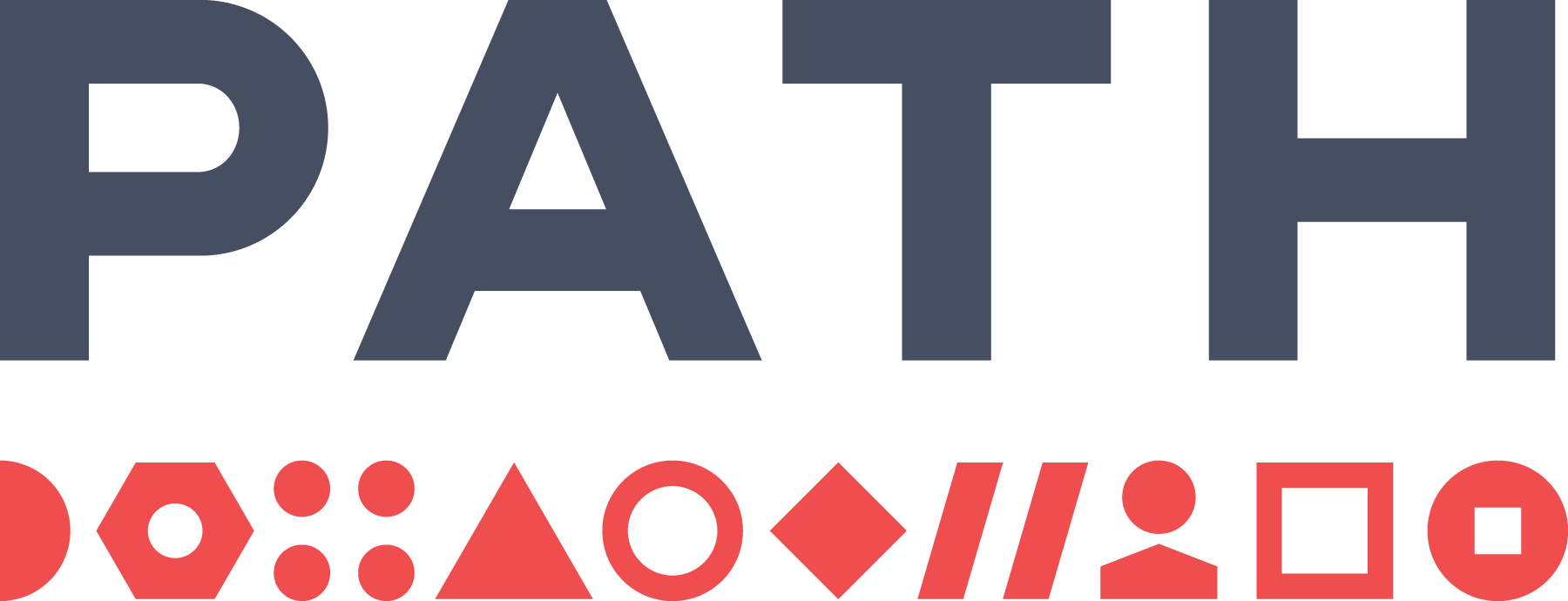

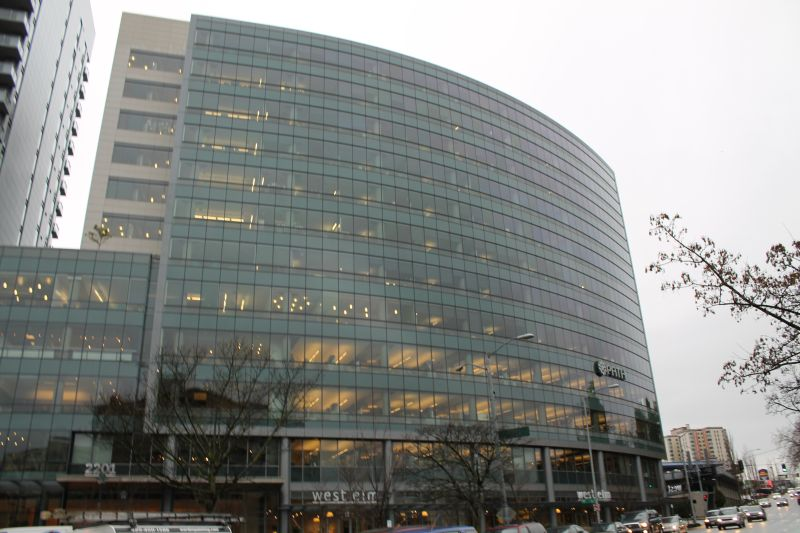
- Headquarters in Seattle
- Type: Nonprofit organization
- Founded: 1977; 49 years ago
- Headquarters: Seattle
- Key people: Nikolaj Gilbert, President and CEO
- Revenue: US$371,288,000 (as of 2024)
- Total assets: 335,091,155 United States dollar (2022)
- Number of employees: 1,600
- Website: www.path.org

PATH (formerly known as the Program for Appropriate Technology in Health) is an international, nonprofit global health organization. PATH is based in Seattle with 1,600 employees in more than 70 countries around the world. Its president and CEO is Nikolaj Gilbert, who is also the Managing Director and CEO of Foundations for Appropriate Technologies in Health (FATH), PATH's Swiss subsidiary. PATH focuses on six platforms: vaccines, drugs, diagnostics, devices, system, and service innovations.

== History ==
Founded in 1977 as the Program for the Introduction and Adaptation of Contraceptive Technology with a focus on family planning, PATH soon broadened its purpose to work on a wide array of emerging and persistent global health issues in the areas of health technologies, maternal health, child health, reproductive health, vaccines and immunization, and emerging and epidemic diseases such as HIV, malaria, tuberculosis, and COVID-19.

In 2000, PATH had 300 employees and an annual budget of $60 million. In 2020, this increased to 1,600 employees and a budget of $323 million.

Between 2009 and 2015, the Gates Foundation provided $968 million in grants to PATH and PATH Vaccine Solutions.

== Developed technologies ==
=== Vaccine and pharmaceutical technologies ===
PATH collaborated with the World Health Organization starting in 1979 to develop the vaccine vial monitor, a small sticker that adheres to a vaccine vial and changes color as the vaccine is exposed to heat over time. The sticker shows when a vaccine has reached its preset temperature limit and can no longer be safely used. It took over thirty years until 2007 for the widespread adoption of this technology by vaccine manufacturers. UNICEF requires these monitors on all vaccines it purchases.

PATH also developed the Uniject injection system. The single-dose, autodisabling injection system consists of a needle attached to a small bubble of plastic that is prefilled with medication. The system is designed to prevent disease transmission and requires low training to administer vaccine and other drugs safely, intended for remote villages.

=== Nutrition ===
Developed by Bon Dente International, Ultra Rice is a manufactured grain owned by PATH. Designed to resemble the texture and appearance of regular rice, it is a micronutrient fortified grain that can be mixed with rice to reduce malnutrition in countries where rice is a staple food. The micronutrients include zinc, folic acid and iron, and it is capable of reducing the incidence of anemia and infant (6-24 month old) mortality in low-income populations. It is typically mixed with regular rice at a 1:100 ratio. Ultra Rice has been produced and tested in several countries, including Brazil, Burundi, and India, where it has been served in school-lunch programs. Starting in 2010, PATH distributed Ultra Rice to Cambodia through food assistance programs and for further research, for which it now has over thirty studies. The results showed that fortified rice was well accepted by children, parents and teachers and consumption of it was similar or better than normal rice. In 2012, PATH entered a business partnership in Brazil with a commercial rice producer to sell Ultra Rice mixed in with regular rice at supermarkets.

=== Sexual and reproductive health ===
PATH technologies address sexual and reproductive health include:

- The careHPV test, developed in conjunction with Qiagen as the first molecular diagnostic to screen for human papillomavirus (HPV)—the most common cause of cervical cancer—in clinics in low-resource settings. China's State Food and Drug Administration approved the test for sale beginning in January 2013, followed by India and other emerging markets. The test is designed specifically for use in clinics that lack reliable clean water or electricity.
- The SILCS diaphragm, a "one size fits most" contraceptive device. The device differs from traditional latex diaphragms in that it is made of silicone instead of latex, is designed to hold up to extreme temperatures and poor storage conditions common in developing countries, and will not require a doctor's fitting.
- The Woman's Condom, a female condom designed to be easier to use effectively, less noisy and more comfortable other female condoms. PATH transferred production of the condom to Dahua Medical Apparatus Company in China in 2008. The condom has received regulatory approvals in China and the European Union and became commercially available in China in late 2011.

=== Water and sanitation ===
PATH looks at ways to improve water quality in developing countries, including helping companies develop low-cost filters, gadgets, and other water-treatment products to stimulate a commercial market and keep prices low. Most recently, PATH partnered with Splash! to develop and test a handwashing station for use in LMICs, specifically in response to the COVID-19 pandemic.

=== Vaccines and immunization ===
Starting in 2010, PATH has collaborated with biotechnology and pharmaceutical companies to support the development of vaccines for diseases such as meningitis and pneumonia and to help countries introduce vaccines for childhood illnesses such as rotavirus and Japanese encephalitis.

==== Meningitis ====
PATH and the World Health Organization, through the Meningitis Vaccine Project, led the development of a vaccine called MenAfriVac to end meningitis A epidemics in sub-Saharan Africa, where 450 million people in 26 countries are at risk of the disease. The vaccine was developed by Serum Institute of India and introduced in Burkina Faso, Mali, and Niger in December 2010 to prevent the spread of a strain of meningitis found only in Africa. Within six months, the vaccine eliminated new cases of meningitis A in the areas where it was introduced. By the end of 2012, the vaccine had reached 100 million people in ten countries: Benin, Burkina Faso, Cameroon, Chad, Ghana, Mali, Niger, Nigeria, Senegal, and Sudan. The introduction of MenAfriVac marked the first time that a vaccine was developed for a disease only found in Africa.

Previously used meningitis vaccines had low efficacy and cost US$80 per dose. The new vaccine has high efficacy against the type of meningitis that is most prevalent in Africa and costs less than US$0.50 per dose. The entire vaccination research and development project cost less than US$100 million, about one-fifth the typical cost for developing a vaccine.

In 2012, MenAfriVac was also approved for storage without refrigeration for up to four days, enabling health workers to more easily reach patients in rural villages or in areas with no power.

==== Rotavirus ====
PATH supports the introduction of vaccines against rotavirus in developing countries to protect young children from severe diarrhea. In 2006, PATH helped Nicaragua become the first developing country to introduce rotavirus vaccines within months of their introduction. Former PATH researcher John Wecker noted that rotavirus infections dropped in areas that began to use the vaccine after the WHO recommended its international use in 2009.

PATH also conducts research to show the impact of rotavirus vaccines and help countries choose whether to adopt the vaccines into their immunization programs.

==== Japanese encephalitis ====
PATH works in India and other countries in the region to introduce an affordable vaccine to protect against Japanese encephalitis—a disease the World Health Organization estimates claims 10,000 to 15,000 lives a year, mostly children, and causes permanent brain damage in many more. In 2006, PATH helped the government of India launch an immunization campaign for children in high-risk areas with the vaccine.

=== Epidemic diseases ===
Part of PATH's work focuses on some of the most widespread and threatening global diseases: malaria, HIV/AIDS, tuberculosis, and influenza.

==== Malaria ====
The PATH Malaria Vaccine Initiative supports several malaria vaccine candidates at various stages of development around the world, including the most advanced candidate, called RTS,S. Researchers studied RTS,S, made by GlaxoSmithKline, in phase 3 clinical trials among infants and young children in sub-Saharan Africa. A 2011 study showed the vaccine provided about 50 percent protection against malaria for young children ages 5 to 17 months, and another 2012 study showed a 33 percent reduction in infants. In October 2013, GlaxoSmithKline reported that the experimental vaccine reduced the number of cases amongst young children by almost 50 percent and among infants by around 25 percent, following the conclusion of an 18-month clinical trial. GlaxoSmithKline is set to submit an application for a marketing license with the European Medicines Agency (EMA) in 2014. The new vaccine has the backing of the UN's Swiss-based WHO which states that it will recommend the use of RTS,S for use starting in 2015, providing it gets approval.

Another PATH initiative to address malaria is the Malaria Control and Evaluation Partnership in Africa (MACEPA), which focuses on controlling malaria through the use of insecticide-treated bednets, indoor spraying of insecticides, new diagnostic tools to find infection, and effective medicines for treatment. In Zambia, this work has helped decrease the rate of malaria among children younger than age 5 by 50 percent in two years.

In December 2012, PATH received an award from the US President's Malaria Initiative for a new malaria project focused on "the expansion of high-quality diagnosis and treatment for malaria and other childhood illnesses and infectious diseases."

PATH's Drug Development program, which grew out of an affiliation with OneWorld Health, is advancing a new, semisynthetic form of the malaria drug artemisinin that will bolster the current, volatile botanical supply. In August 2014, PATH and Sanofi announced the release of the first batch of semisynthetic artemisinin. 1.7 million doses of Sanofi's ArteSunate AmodiaQuine Winthrop (ASAQ Winthrop), a fixed-dose artemisinin-based combination therapy will be shipped to half a dozen African countries over the next few months.

==== HIV/AIDS ====
PATH works in Africa, Asia, and other regions to slow the spread of HIV/AIDS and provide support for people affected by the disease. For example, in Kenya, PATH has conducted over two decades of research into HIV and pregnancy prevention. PATH also provides support groups and health services for married adolescents and other groups at high risk for HIV. It also aliases with local governments and community organizations to strengthen and expand services for HIV/AIDS, malaria, tuberculosis, and maternal and newborn health.

Other PATH projects to address HIV in Africa include improving access to HIV treatment and services in Ethiopia and expanding HIV counseling and testing and other services in the Democratic Republic of Congo.

PATH uses behavior change communication techniques to encourage healthy behaviors for HIV prevention. One of the best-known examples is PATH's work with "magnet theater" in Kenya, India, Vietnam, and other developing countries. Named because of its natural pulling power, this interactive street theater draws people in rural communities to clearings, dirt roads, and village centers—any open space where people can gather. There, actors banter with their audiences and pull them into the play, stimulating dialogue about HIV/AIDS and other taboo subjects and helping individuals re-examine behaviors that contribute to poor health.

=== Maternal and child health ===
In addition to its work on vaccines for childhood illnesses, PATH addresses pregnancy complications, nutrition issues, and other health challenges that affect women and children in developing countries and lead to higher rates of illness and death.

In 2012, PATH completed a seven-year project in India focused on safe birth for mothers and babies. PATH worked with local governments and community groups to encourage community leaders, health workers, pregnant women, and families to deliver babies in health centers, rather than at home, and adopt other best practices to protect mothers and their infants during pregnancy, childbirth, and infancy. The project used community outreach approaches including door-to-door clinical surveillance, distribution of printed health materials, and street theater to spread messages about maternal and newborn health.

In South Africa, PATH leads a five-year project to improve the health and development of 750,000 pregnant women and children by encouraging breastfeeding and improving health care for pregnant women and young children.

== Funding and expenses ==
PATH's income in 2020 was $303,223,000 and its expenses in 2020 were US$294,369,000. 86.4% of its budget was spent on program activities, 12.8% on administration, and .8% on fundraising.

In 2010, PATH received the most US foundation grants in the state of Washington and ranked thirteenth among international recipients of US foundation grants.

== Unethical Practices ==
In 2012, the NGO was warned by the Indian government after one of its studies involving an HPV vaccine resulted in the alleged death of seven girls belonging to an indigenous community (tribe) in India. All seven deaths were later attributed to other causes, including a snake bite, drowning, suicide by pesticide ingestion, and complications from malaria.

In what The Hindu called "a shockingly unethical trial", nearly 2,800 consent forms were signed by a hostel warden or headmaster, as the 'guardian'.

== Recognition ==
In 2003, PATH received the Tech Museum's Dr. Alejandro Zaffaroni Health Award for its work on the Uniject device, a sterile pre-filled, single-use syringe.

Since 2005, PATH has remained on Forbes' top 200 list of the 200 largest charities in America.

For five years running, Fast Company magazine in 2008 named PATH as one of the top social entrepreneurs who are changing the world.

In 2009, PATH received the Conrad N. Hilton Humanitarian Prize.

In 2012, PATH was ranked as the sixth best NGO in the world on the "top 100" list published by The Global Journal.

As of March 2019, PATH has been vetted and is in good standing as part of GlobalGiving's GG Rewards program.

In 2022, PATH was named in the Forbes Top 100 Charities.

== See also ==
- Philanthropy
- Concept Foundation
- Reproductive Health Supplies Coalition
- GAVI Alliance
- Global health
- Zika virus
