= Tubex (syringe cartridge) =

The Tubex Syringe cartridge was developed c. 1943 during World War II by the Wyeth company. It is a drug pre-filled glass cartridge syringe with an attached sterile needle, which is inserted in a reusable stainless steel holder (now plastic). The product was manufactured for immediate injection once the pre-filled cartridge was attached to the reusable holder and the needle protector was removed.

Its development followed the use of several other immediate use products, such as the Syrette, a flexible tube, not unlike an ophthalmic ointment tube designed to hold a needle. The Syrette was developed by Squibb and was used for immediate use of morphine on the battle front. However it fell into disuse because of leakage and sterility problems. Another product, called the Ampin proved problematic as well.

The Tubex system was widely used after World War II and expanded as a system of distributing and administration a large variety of drugs from antibiotics to vaccines in a pre-filled glass cartridge syringe with attached sterile needle. It aided in a standardization of an immediate use sterile dosage forms. It was a time saver for nursing administration time, as nurses no longer had to draw up an injection. It was conducive to inventory control and accountability for narcotic substances in a tamper proof packing. It was widely used by doctors, nurses and pharmacists for the administration of drugs. Although a few products are still manufactured in Tubex, the Wyeth company has discontinued the entire line of products and has licensed its use to other companies. The carpuject Hospira has now replaced the tubex as the sole competitor in this unitized syringe medication delivery system.

== Bibliography ==
- Turco, Salvatore; King, Robert E (1987). Sterile Dosage Forms, Their Preparation and Clinical Application. Philadelphia: Lea & Febiger. pp. 267–269. ISBN 0-8121-1067-6.
