= Peter Beyer (professor) =

German geneticist

- Born: 9 May 1952 (age 74); Hanover, Lower Saxony, West Germany
- Education: University of Marburg; University of Freiburg
- Awards: 2002 European Science Prize
- Scientific career
- Fields: Cell biology
- Workplaces: University of Freiburg

Peter Beyer (born 9 May 1952) is a German professor for cell biology at the Faculty of Biology of the University of Freiburg. He is known as co-inventor of golden rice, together with Ingo Potrykus from the ETH Zurich.

== Biography ==
Peter Beyer studied biology at the universities of Marburg and Freiburg. In 1981, he was awarded his doctorate in cell biology from the University of Freiburg and received his habilitation in 2000. Afterwards, he was appointed Professor for Cell Biology at the Faculty of Biology.

Since 2001, Beyer has been Vice-Director Plant Biotechnology of the Centre for Applied Biosciences (ZAB) in Freiburg.

Starting in 2005, Peter Beyer became Principal Investigator in the ProVitaMinRice Consortium, a program funded by the Bill & Melinda Gates Foundation and one of the selected Grand Challenges in Global Health projects. The project «Engineering Rice for High Beta-Carotene, Vitamin E and Enhanced Iron and Zinc Bioavailability», designed to further biofortify Golden Rice with other vital micronutrients has been awarded 11.3 Million USD to achieve its goals. Research is handled by a consortium of seven laboratories in a number of countries.

Apart from Beyer's group the project involves groups from Baylor College of Medicine, Michigan State University, the International Rice Research Institute and PhilRice, both in the Philippines, the Cuu Long Delta Rice Research Institute, and the Chinese University of Hong Kong.

== Research ==
Peter Beyer’s research focusses on the biochemistry, molecular biology and regulation of the plant [prenyl-lipid metabolism (sterols, vitamins E and K, carotenoids. Besides basic science the group focuses on applied pathway engineering to improve the nutritional value of crop plants. Peter Beyer pioneered the metabolic engineering of plants with engineering the beta-carotene biosynthetic pathway into rice endosperm, published 2000 in Science, which is widely appreciated as one of the success stories of Synthetic Biology. Consequently, Beyer is PI in the Centre for Biological Signaling Studies, which is devoted to this novel field in science.

== Awards and honors ==
- 2002 European Science Prize
- 2006 Voted as "Most notable and influential people in agricultural, environmental or industrial biotech research of the last ten years" by the readers of Nature Biotechnology

Beyer has been recognized as a Pioneer Member of the American Society of Plant Biologists.

== Publications ==
- The Golden Rice patent: Beyer P and Potrykus I. Method for improving the agronomic and nutritional value of plants EP1159428 B1, 5. Dezember 2001.
- Ye X, Al-Babili S, Klöti A, Zhang J, Lucca P, Beyer P, Potrykus I (2000) Engineering the provitamin A (beta-carotene) biosynthetic pathway into (carotenoid-free) rice endosperm. Science 287:303-305.
- S. Al-Babili, P. Beyer: Golden Rice - five years on the road - five years to go? In: Trends in Plant Science. 12 October 2005 S. 565-573
