= University of Freiburg Faculty of Biology =

Faculty of Biology
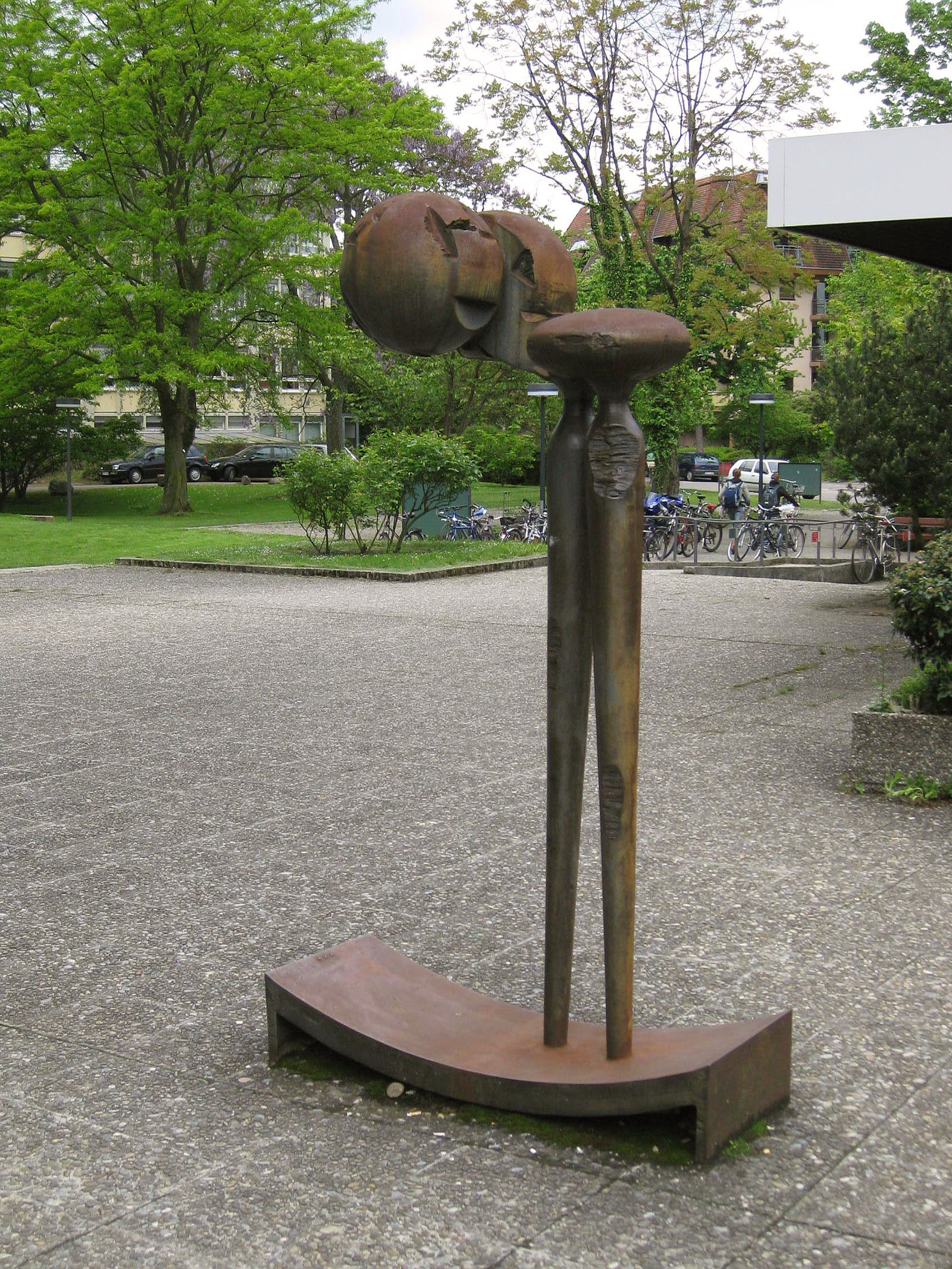
- Venus von Krieau (Figur 81) by the Austrian sculptor Rudolf Hoflehner, 1964, in front of the faculty building
- Type: Faculty
- Established: 1970
- Affiliations: University of Freiburg
- Dean: Dierk Reiff
- Students: over 1,300
- Location: Freiburg, Baden-Württemberg, Germany
- Website: www.bio.uni-freiburg.de

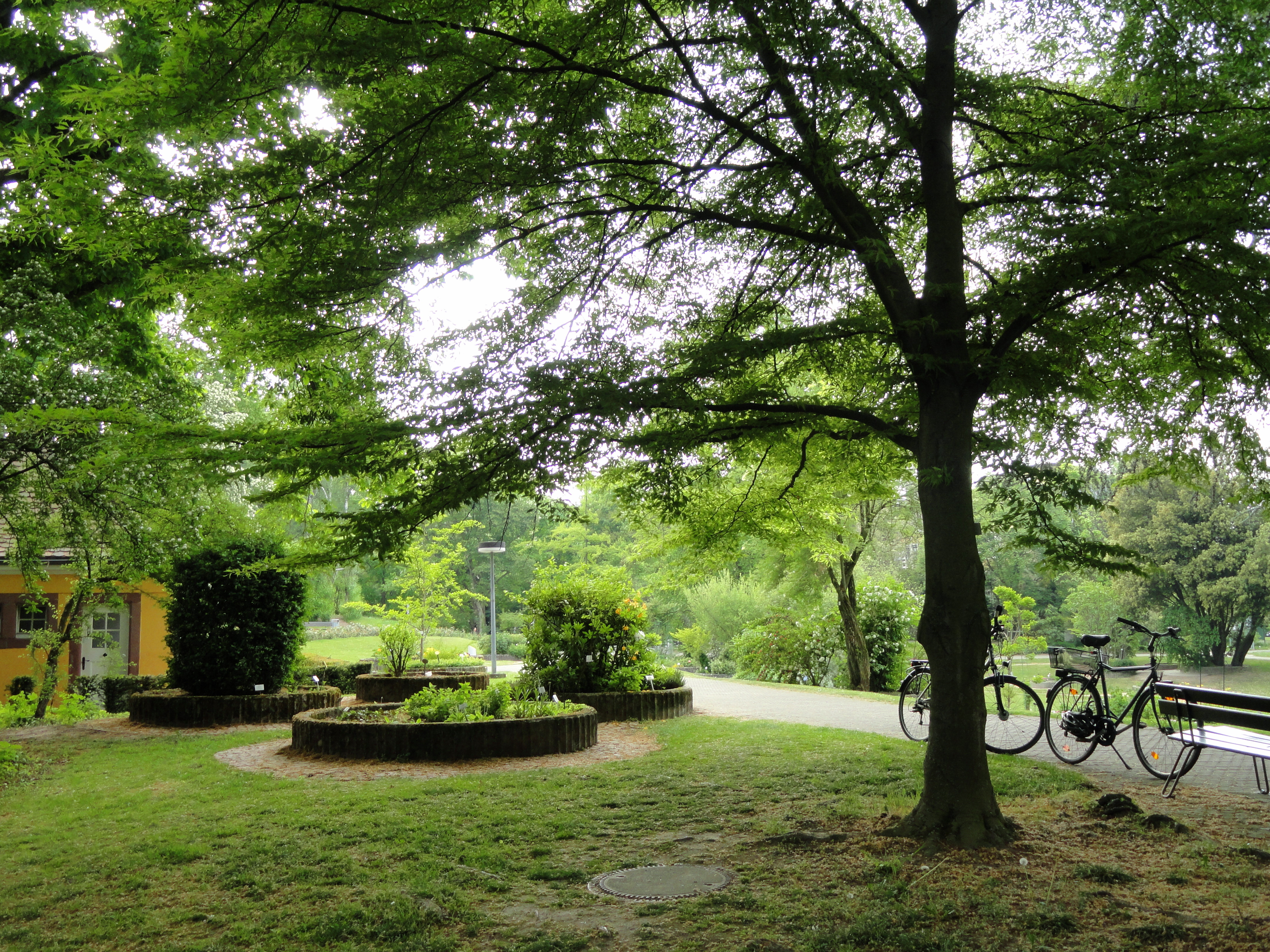
Outdoor area of the botanical garden

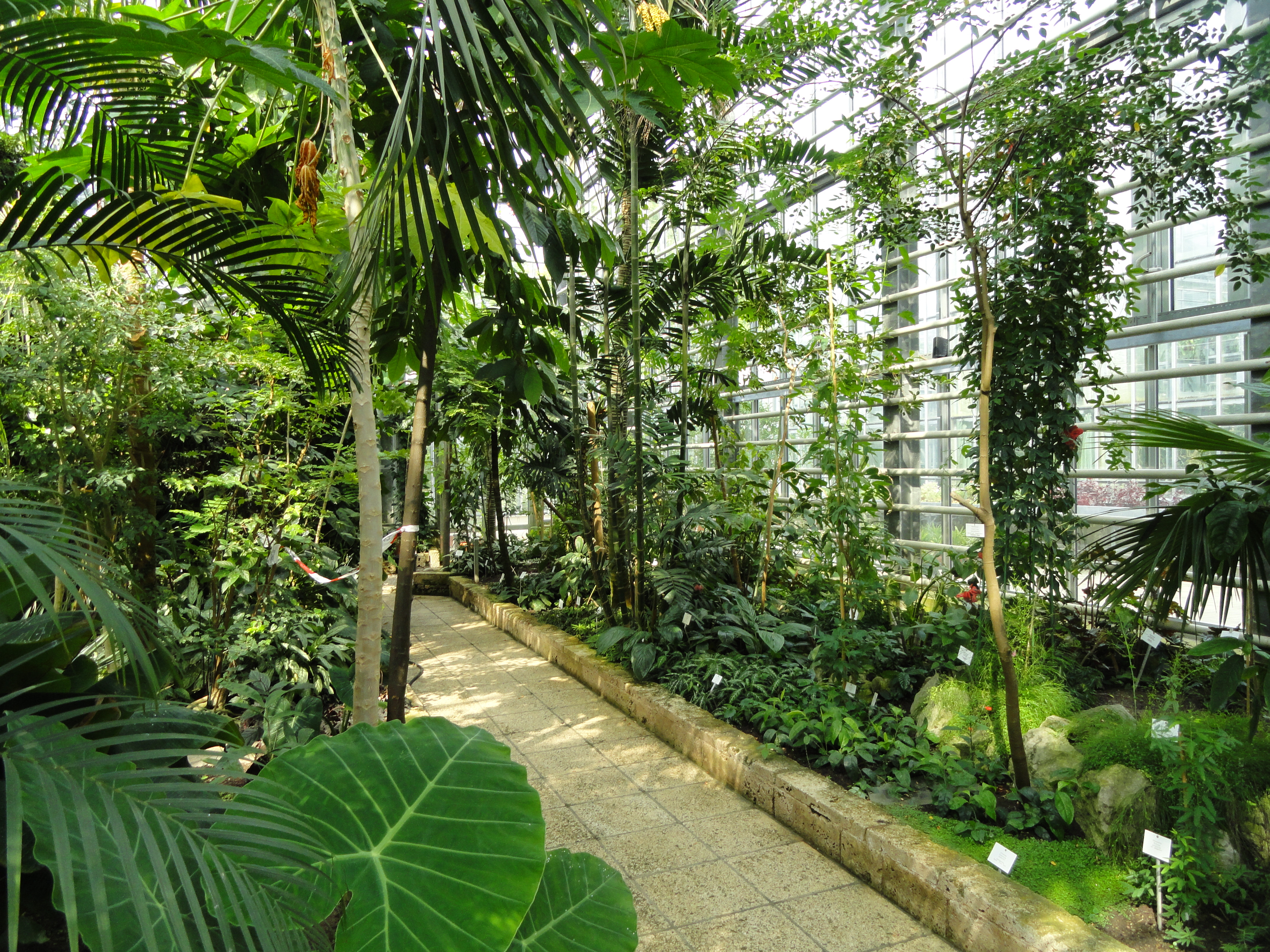
Freiburg Botanic Garden, greenhouse

The Faculty of Biology is one of the eleven faculties of the University of Freiburg in Freiburg im Breisgau, Baden-Württemberg, Germany. It is part of a strong life sciences network including institutions such as the Max Planck Institute of Immunobiology and Epigenetics, the Bernstein Center Freiburg (BCF), the Center for Applied Biosciences (Zentrum für angewandte Biowissenschaften, ZAB) and the Center for Biological Systems Analysis (Zentrum für Biosystemanalyse, ZBSA), which started operations in 2008 as offspring of the Freiburg Initiative for Systems Biology (FRISYS), funded by the Federal Ministry of Education and Research (BMBF).

== History ==
The faculty of biology began to develop in 1960, when Friedrich Oehlkers forwarded the ordinary of botany to Hans Mohr and Bernhard Hassenstein took the chair of Zoology as successor of Otto Koehler. Back then, the department of biology was still part of the Naturwissenschaftlich-Mathematische Fakultät (faculty of natural sciences and mathematics), which had been established in 1767. In 1963 and 1964, the "second generation" of ordinaries – Bresch (genetics), Drews (microbiology), Grisebach (biochemistry) and Sander (developmental biology of animals) – joined the founding fathers Mohr and Hassenstein. The "third generation" with the ordinaries Elster (limnology), Hertel (molecular biology), Osche (ecology and evolutionary biology of animals), Sitte (cellular biology), Spatz (biophysics) and the female professor Otti Wilmanns (geobotany) followed between 1967 and 1969. Within hardly one decade, the department of biology had become a subject with twelve fields, making the establishment of an "own" faculty in compliance with a new constitution of the university in the year of 1970 a logical consequence.

== Faculty today ==
In 2008 (German Wintersemester 2008/2009), teaching courses have been reorganized according to the Bologna Agreement, replacing the original German diploma with the Bachelor-Master-System. Currently, the faculty offers a Bachelor's course in biology and two different Master courses: the Master of Science in biology and the Master of Science in Bioinformatics and Systems biology. The trinational, trilingual biotechnology program offered at the École supérieure de biotechnologie Strasbourg (ESBS) is also partially funded by, and held at, the University of Freiburg faculty of biology.

More than 1300 students are currently enrolled (as of 2011), among those about 300 in the old diploma program, 400 in the bachelor program and 350 in the German Lehramt-program (Staatsexamen).

=== Excellence ===
In 2010 the faculty was ranked in the "Excellence Group" for "biology, chemistry and mathematics" and among Germany's top research universities in the field of biology, according to the 2012 CHE University Ranking, according to several criteria. Several institutions funded within the German Universities Excellence Initiative are affiliated to the faculty of biology:

- Centre for Biological Signalling Studies (bioss)
- Spemann Graduate School of Biology and Medicine (SGBM)
- Freiburg Institute for Advanced Studies (FRIAS)
- BrainLinks-BrainTools

=== Botanical garden ===
The faculty's botanical garden was founded in 1620 by the university's Faculty of Medicine as hortus medicus. It was almost completely destroyed during the Thirty Years' War in 1632 and in 1677, when the city of Freiburg was taken by French troops, barracks were built on the former area of the botanical garden.

The botanical garden was relocated to an area of 2.7 hectares close to the river Dreisam in 1766, where the first greenhouses were built in the years of 1827 and 1828. Due to the city's expansion, the garden had to be relocated again in 1879.

Today's botanical garden was built in yet another, fourth location between 1912 and 1920. It features four exhibition greenhouses that, in total, span an area of 910 m^{2}. They are thematically divided into "tropic", "ferns", "succulents" and "cold house" (mainly species from Australia and New Zealand). A research greenhouse is considered a special feature of the faculty.

=== iGEM ===
The University of Freiburg team has been the first German team to participate in the International Genetically Engineered Machine (iGEM) undergraduate synthetic biology competition held at the Massachusetts Institute of Technology, where it repeatedly scored highly. The participation in the competition is supported by numerous university institutions, among them the Centre for Biological Signalling Studies (bioss) funded by the German Universities Excellence Initiative.

=== Golden rice ===
The genetically engineered golden rice was developed by the University of Freiburg professor Peter Beyer and the ETH Zurich professor Ingo Potrykus from 1992 to 2000. It was considered a breakthrough in biotechnology at the time of publication and now helps to provide Vitamin A to people lacking access to it in their diet. One existing crop, genetically engineered "golden rice" that produces vitamin A, already holds enormous promise for reducing blindness and dwarfism that result from a vitamin-A deficient diet.

=== International Moss Stock Center (IMSC) ===
The faculty provides service centres such as the International Moss Stock Center (IMSC) which collects, preserves and distributes several mosses for scientific research.

== Notable affiliates ==
- Erwin Baur
- Alexander Braun
- Carsten Bresch
- Heinrich Anton de Bary
- Salome Gluecksohn-Waelsch
- Georges J. F. Köhler – Nobel Prize (1984, Physiology or Medicine)
- Otto Koehler
- Carl Nägeli
- Lorenz Oken
- Karl Julius Perleb
- Julius von Sachs
- Rudolph Schoenheimer
- Hans Spemann – Nobel Prize (1953, Physiology or Medicine)
- Christiane Nüsslein-Volhard – Nobel Prize (1995, Physiology or Medicine)
- Mikhail Stepanovich Voronin
- Herbert E. Walter
- August Weismann

The following faculty members or affiliates have been awarded the Gottfried Wilhelm Leibniz Prize:

- 1996 Michael Reth – Immunology (Max Planck Institute of Immunobiology and Epigenetics, Freiburg)
- 1997 Georg Fuchs – Microbiology (University of Freiburg)
- 1999 Bernd Bukau – Cell biology (University of Freiburg)
