= Artificial rice =

Processed rice product

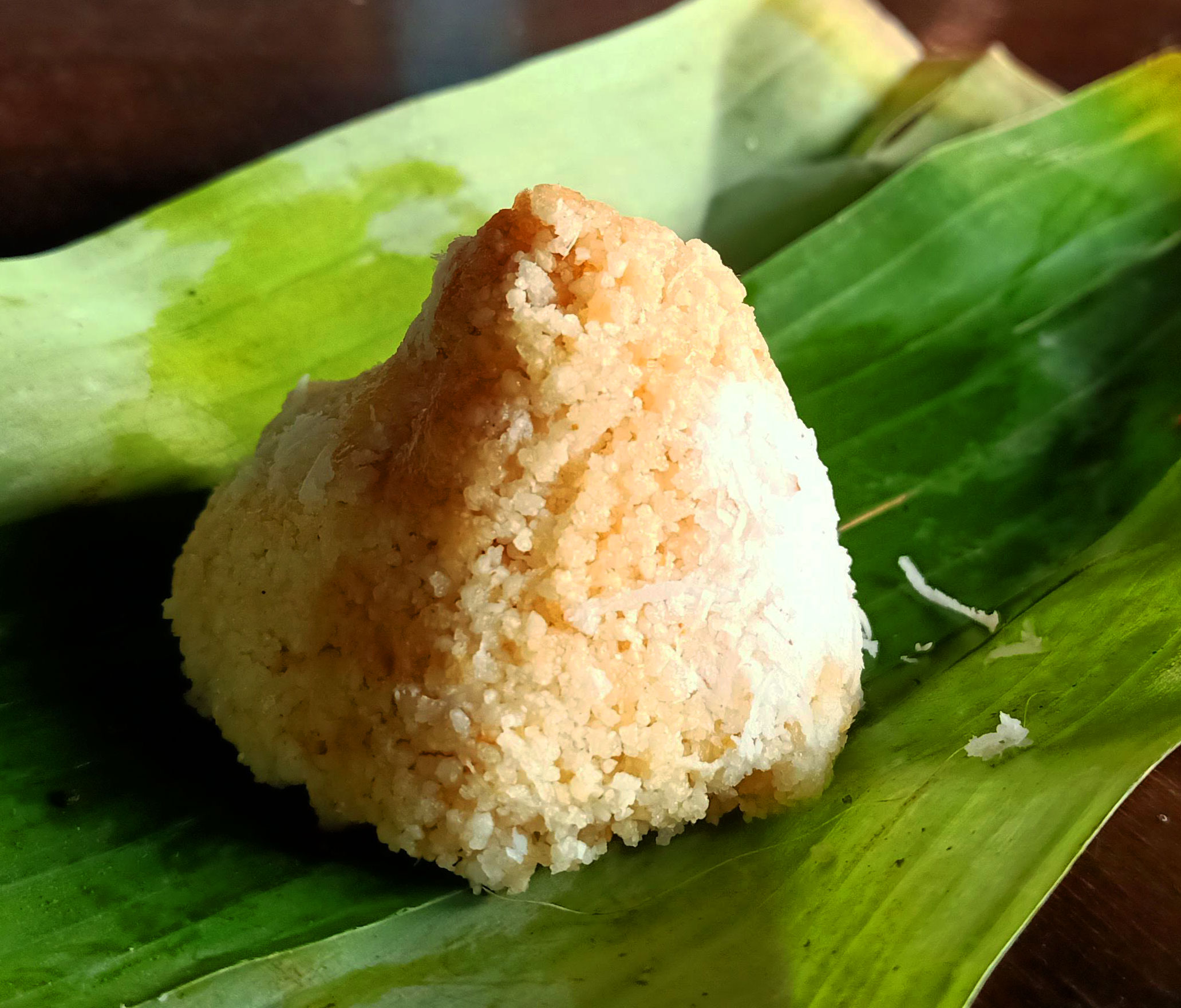
An artificial rice made from cassava flour

Artificial rice is a synthetic grain product made to resemble rice. It is usually made from broken rice, sometimes with the addition of other cereals, and often fortified with micronutrients, including minerals, such as iron and zinc, and vitamins, such as vitamin A and vitamin B.

== Manufacturing process ==
Rice-making machines exist that allow broken rice or other ingredients to be shaped into rice-shaped pellets. Rice fortification presents numerous technical problems. Micronutrients cannot be simply added to the kernels, because they do not stay where they are needed and the traditional soaking and rinsing of rice with water prior to cooking removes most of the added nutrients.

In the hot extrusion process, rice flour and micronutrients are transformed into a product visually resembling natural rice. Thereby, vitamins and minerals are embedded and protected from segregation and from being removed through rinsing or leaching out during washing and cooking.

== NutriRice ==
NutriRice is a kind of recomposed fortified rice. The NutriRice process is a way of rice fortification utilized hot extrusion technology not only addresses the problem of hidden hunger but also meets the challenge of implementing rice fortification. The production of NutriRice offers the unique possibility to efficiently fortify rice with multiple micronutrients. Vitamins and minerals such as vitamin A and B family as well as iron and zinc can be chosen for inclusion.

With respect to fortified rice properties, such as wash stability, shelf stability, cooking behavior, visual appearance, and cooked rice texture, hot extrusion can be recommended to produce the fortified rice kernel. The fortified rice kernel through hot extrusion most closely resembles natural rice after cooking.

The children of 600 migrant workers attend the Dandelion Middle School in Beijing, some of them as resident pupils. In 2008, as part of a pilot project, all pupils at the school were given NutriRice for a period of 8 months. During the eight-month trial period, the effects of malnutrition were reduced by 50%, thus raising the pupils' general nutritional status to the average urban level.

== Ultra Rice ==
Ultra Rice was developed by Dr. James P. Cox and his wife Jeanne over a course of 20 years, starting in the 1960s while living in Canada. The process Dr. and Mrs. Cox developed was more expensive to execute than the market value of the product and they eventually transferred their patent for the process to PATH (global health organization). Ultra Rice was first made generally available in 2005.

Researchers assessed the stability of Ultra Rice's vitamins as the rice is stored; ascorbate, saturated fat and antioxidants were found to help keep the vitamin A intact during storage in high humidity. Another study found that vitamin A losses would stabilize after six months and that the loss of vitamin A during cooking could be predicted.

A lack of vitamin A can cause night blindness; a study in 2005 showed that 348 pregnant Nepali women who ate Ultra Rice had improvement in night vision which did not differ significantly from the improvement which could come from vitamin A as liver, carrots, capsule, or green leafy vegetables.

The Department of Biotechnology (India), Ministry of Agriculture (Brazil), Universidade Federal de Viçosa (Brazil), and the University of Toronto (Canada) contributed to the research and development of the Ultra Rice plan. In 2009 The Tech Museum of Innovation recognized PATH for Ultra Rice with an award in recognition of its use of technology to solve major world problems.

== Other grains ==
=== Corn rice ===
In North Korea, an artificial "corn rice", known as Okssal (옥쌀) or Gangnagssal (강낭쌀) was made from maize.

=== Konjac rice ===
Konjac rice was developed for low-calorie diet.

== See also ==
- Ptitim, an Israeli wheat pasta developed as a substitute for rice.
- Orzo, another rice-shaped pasta
- Golden rice, a genetically modified type of rice which requires no processing to add vitamin A (via beta carotene)
