= Peter Bramley (biochemist) =

British biochemist and emeritus professor

- Born: 12 June 1948 (age 78)

Academic background
- Education: Long Eaton Grammar School
- Alma mater: University College of Wales Aberystwyth
- Thesis: Carotenoid biosynthesis in microorganisms (1973)

Academic work
- Institutions: Royal Holloway, University of London

Peter M. Bramley is a British biochemist and emeritus professor of biochemistry at Royal Holloway, University of London, where he was the Head of the School of Biological Sciences from 2006 to 2011. His research focuses on the biosynthesis of carotenoids in plants and microorganisms.

Bramley was educated at Long Eaton Grammar School and the University College of Wales Aberystwyth, where he graduated with a BSc in biochemistry (1969) and later obtained a PhD. He was appointed lecturer in biochemistry at Royal Holloway in 1972, professor of biochemistry in 1996, and remained there throughout his career. For his PhD he studied carotenoid formation in mutants of Phycomyces blakesleeanus, developing cell extracts for in vitro assays of enzyme activities. These cell free systems facilitated investigations on the mode of action of bleaching herbicides that inhibit carotenoid formation.

Since the 1990s he has focused on the biosynthesis of carotenoids and other isoprenoids in higher plants, particularly tomato. This research led to tomato lines with elevated and altered carotenoids. His laboratory was the first to produce a GM tomato with elevated levels of β–carotene (provitamin A). His work on the regulation of β–carotene formation established the advantage of using a single bacterial gene, rather than multiple plant desaturases, in the modification of plants to produce lycopene. This discovery was instrumental for the development of Golden Rice, a type of genetically modified rice that can be used to alleviate vitamin A deficiency. His laboratory has also developed methods to identify and quantity genetically modified proteins in foods, the presence of mechanically recovered meat in meat products and the identification of the animal species in processed foods.
