= Ingo Potrykus =

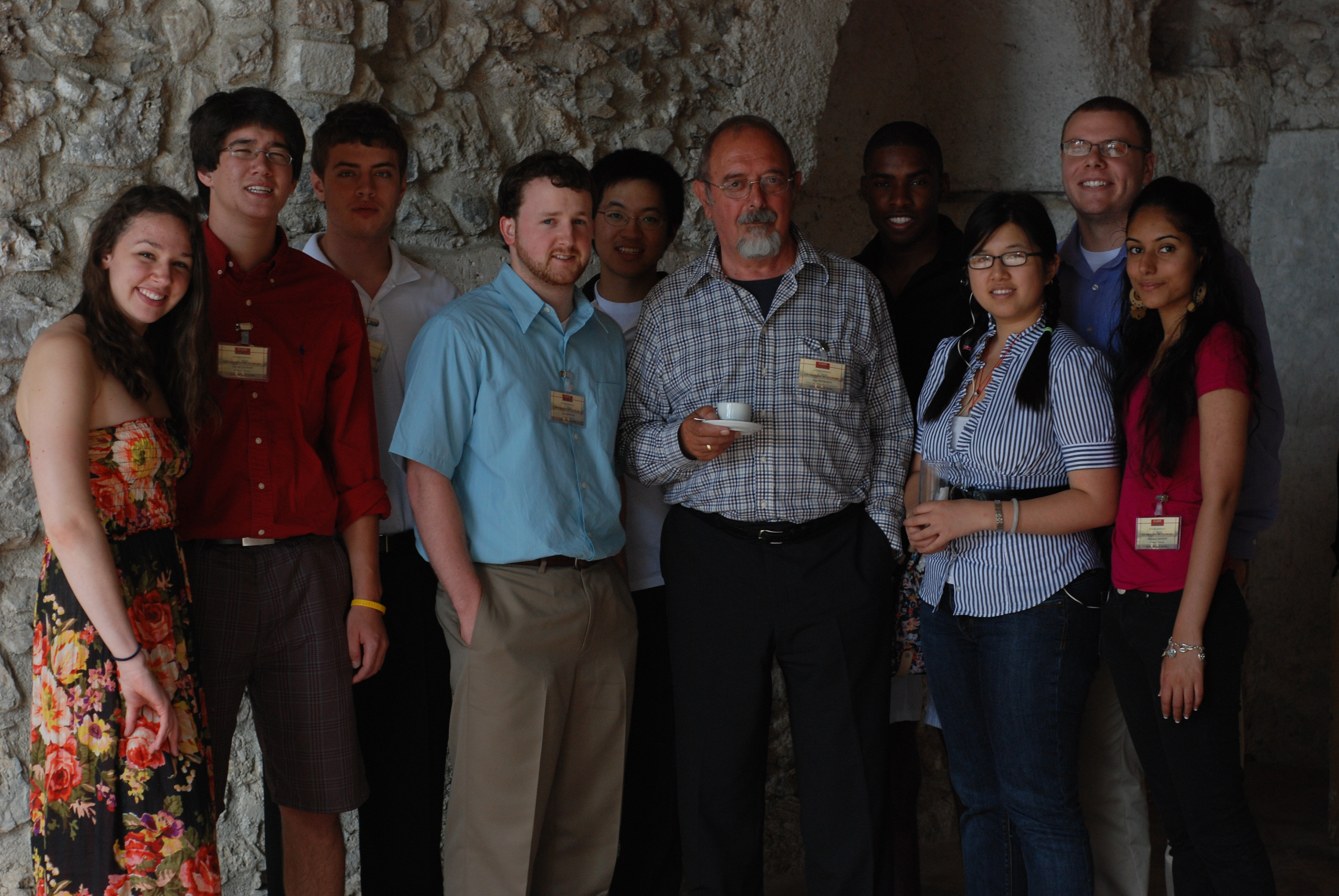
- Born: 5 December 1933 (age 92); Hirschberg im Riesengebirge, Province of Lower Silesia, Germany
- Education: University of Cologne
- Scientific career
- Fields: Biology
- Workplaces: ETH Zurich

Ingo Potrykus (born 5 December 1933) is a German biologist who is Professor Emeritus of Plant Sciences at the Institute of Plant Sciences of the Swiss Federal Institute of Technology (ETH), Zurich from which he retired in 1999. His research group applied gene technology to contribute to food security in developing countries. Together with Peter Beyer, he is one of the co-inventors of golden rice. In 2014 he was chairman of the Golden Rice Humanitarian Board.

== Education and career ==
Potrykus studied biology at the University of Cologne and earned his doctorate at the Max-Planck Institute for Plant Breeding Research, Cologne, Germany. After several years at the Institute of Plant Physiology, University of Hohenheim, he became research group leader at the Max-Planck Institute for Plant Genetics. Ladenburg, Germany. In 1976 he transferred to Basel, Switzerland to establish the area of plant genetic engineering at the Friedrich Miescher Institute. In 1986 he became professor of plant sciences at the Swiss Federal Institute of Technology, concentrating on the Biotechnology of Plants. He retired from this institute in 1999 at the age of 65.

== Research ==
Motivated by the upcoming food crisis problem of malnutrition in developing countries and the potential of gene technology to contribute to food security, Potrykus and his research group dedicated their work to genetic engineering projects aimed at improving yield stability and food quality of crops such as rice, wheat, millet, sorghum, and cassava. The most significant development so far has been the creation of golden rice, a new rice variety providing vitamin A. This strain of rice is widely seen as the model example of how to sustainably reduce malnutrition in developing countries. Potrykus began thinking about using genetic engineering to improve the nutritional qualities of rice in the late 1980s. He knew that of some 3 billion people who depend on rice as their staple crop, around 10% risk some level of vitamin A deficiency. This problem interested Potrykus for numerous reasons, including the scientific challenge of transferring not just a single gene, but a group of genes that represented a key part of a biochemical pathway. In 1993, with funding from the Rockefeller Foundation, Potrykus teamed up with Peter Beyer and they launched what would become a seven-year, $2.6 million project to develop Golden Rice.

Since his retirement in 1999, Ingo Potrykus - as president of the International Humanitarian Golden Rice Board - has devoted his energy to guiding Golden Rice towards subsistence farmers across the many hurdles of a GMO-crop. To this end he has been established collaboration with 14 rice institutions in India, China, Vietnam, Bangladesh, Indonesia, and Philippines. In 2013 Potrykus met the Pope who offered his personal blessing to Golden Rice although the Pope was concerned that genetic modification benefited big business rather than the poor.

== Personal life ==
Potrykus has been married since 1960 to Inge Heilingbrunner. He has three children and eight grandchildren.

== Awards and honors ==
- Kumho (International Society for Plant Molecular Biology) Science International Award in Plant Molecular Biology and Biotechnology 2000.
- American Society of Plant Biologists (ASPB) Leadership in Science Public Service Award 2001.
- Crop Science of America (CSSA) Klepper Endowment Lectureship 2001,
- Crop Science of America (CSSSA) President's Award 2002,
- European Culture Award in Science 2002,
- Honorary Doctor, Swedish University of Agricultural Sciences 2002.
- Member of the Pontifical Academy of Sciences of the Vatican since 2005
- Member of Academia Europaea
- Member of Hungarian Academy of Sciences
- Member of Swiss Academy of Technical Sciences
- Voted one of the Top 100 Living Contributors to Biotechnology in the journal Science in 2005
- The most notable contributor to agricultural, environmental and industrial biotechnology over the preceding 10 years in Nature Biotechnology in 2006
- Honorary doctor at the University of Freiburg in 2007
- Bertebos prize by the Royal Swedish Academy of Agriculture and Forestry in 2007

== Publications ==
- Al-Babili S, Ye X, Lucca P, Potrykus I, Beyer P (2001) Biosynthesis of beta-carotene (provitamin A) in rice endosperm achieved by genetic engineering. Novartis Found Symp 236:219-28; discussion 228-232.
- Beyer P, Al-Babili S, Ye X, Lucca P, Schaub P, Welsch R, Potrykus I (2002) Golden Rice: Introducing the {beta}-Carotene Biosynthesis Pathway into Rice Endosperm by Genetic Engineering to Defeat Vitamin A Deficiency. J. Nutr. 132:506S-510.
- Burkhardt P, Beyer P, Wunn J, Kloti A, Armstrong G, Schledz M, von Lintig J, Potrykus I (1997) Transgenic rice (Oryza sativa) endosperm expressing daffodil (Narcissus pseudonarcissus) phytoene synthase accumulates phytoene, a key intermediate of provitamin A biosynthesis. Plant J 11:1071-1078.
- Futterer J, Potrykus I, Bao Y, Li L, Burns T, Hull R, Hohn T (1996) Position-dependent ATT initiation during plant pararetrovirus rice tungro bacilliform virus translation. J. Virol. 70:2999-3010.
- Futterer J, Rothnie H, Hohn T, Potrykus I (1997) Rice tungro bacilliform virus open reading frames II and III are translated from polycistronic pregenomic RNA by leaky scanning. J. Virol. 71:7984-7989.
- Hoa TTC, Al-Babili S, Schaub P, Potrykus I, Beyer P (2003) Golden Indica and Japonica Rice Lines Amenable to Deregulation. Plant Physiology 133:161-169.
- Kloti A, He X, Potrykus I, Hohn T, Futterer J (2002) Tissue-specific silencing of a transgene in rice. PNAS 99:10881-10886.
- Lucca P, Hurrell R, Potrykus I (2002) Fighting Iron Deficiency Anemia with Iron-Rich Rice. J. Am. Coll. Nutr. 21:184S-190.
- Paszkowski U, Zhang S, Potrykus I, Paszkowski J (1993) Replication of the DNA A component of African cassava mosaic virus in a heterologous system. J. Gen. Virol. 74:2725-2729.
- Pietrzak M, Shillito R, Hohn T, Potrykus I (1986) Expression in plants of two bacterial antibiotic resistance genes after protoplast transformation with a new plant expression vector. Nucleic Acids Res. 14:5857-5868.
- Potrykus I (2001) Golden Rice and Beyond. Plant Physiology 125:1157-1161.
- Schlaman H, Gisel A, Quaedvlieg N, Bloemberg G, Lugtenberg B, Kijne J, Potrykus I, Spaink H, Sautter C (1997) Chitin oligosaccharides can induce cortical cell division in roots of Vicia sativa when delivered by ballistic microtargeting. Development 124:4887-4895.
- Ye X, Al-Babili S, Klöti A, Zhang J, Lucca P, Beyer P, Potrykus I (2000) Engineering the Provitamin A (β-Carotene) Biosynthetic Pathway into (Carotenoid-Free) Rice Endosperm. Science 287:303-305.

== See also ==
- University of Freiburg Faculty of Biology
