= Carpuject =

The carpuject is a syringe device for the administration of injectable fluid medication. It was patented by the Sterling Drug Company, which became the Sterling Winthrop, after World War II. It is designed with a luer-lock device to accept a sterile hypodermic needle or to be linked directly to intravenous tubing line. The product can deliver an intravenous or intramuscular injection by means of a holder which attaches to the barrel and plunger to the barrel plug. Medication is prefilled into the syringe barrel. When the plug at the end of the barrel is advanced to the head of the barrel it discharges and releases the contents through the needle or into the lumen of the tubing.

The carpuject competed with the tubex injection system developed by Wyeth. It has been redesigned several times to comply with sterility and infection controls standards.

In 1974, Sterling opened a manufacturing plant in McPherson, Kansas. In 1988 Kodak purchased Winthrop Labs and in 1994 sold the injectable drug division and all intellectual property rights to Sanofi, a French pharmaceutical company, now Sanofi Aventis. In 1997 Sanofi sold the injectable carpuject line of business to Abbott Laboratories of Abbott Park, IL for US$200 million. They added generic injectable drugs to the injectable line. In about 2004 Abbott separated its hospital supply line into a separate hospital supply company, Hospira from its drug division. The split placed all of Abbott's hospital products in a separate division. In 2015, Hospira, including the carpuject device, was purchased by Pfizer.
