= Uniject =

Uniject is a disposable, pre-filled, single-use syringe which was developed to promote vaccination in developing countries. It was developed by PATH as part of the solution to the problem of delivering vaccines to areas which have insufficient medical workers to meet the needs of traditional, doctor-mediated vaccination programs.

== History ==
The Uniject was invented by PATH in 1987.

In 2003 PATH accepted a Tech Award from The Tech Museum of Innovation for its development of the Uniject.

== Use ==
To activate the device, the user would first shake the device to homogenize the liquid suspension. Then, the tamper-evident seal would be twisted. After that, with "a firm, rapid motion" the needle shield would be pushed into the port until the "gap between the needle shield and port closes completely". To actually use the device, the needle shield needs to be removed, exposing the needle. The user would then push the needle into the skin. Almost simultaneously, the reservoir would be pushed down in a similar motion to opening a blister pack or using a syrette, dispensing the medication through the needle into the skin. The device, once used, should be considered sharps waste.

The introduction of the Uniject has been called "the greatest single leap forward in the battle against tetanus" because it has allowed tetanus vaccines to be used in places which were previously inaccessible to health programs.

== See also ==
- Syrette
