= Humanitarian use licenses =

Humanitarian use licenses are provisions in a license whereby inventors and technology suppliers protect in advance the possibility of sharing their technology with people in need. Thus, humanitarian use licenses set the conditions for the provision of access to innovations for people in need at a royalty free basis or at lower costs. Humanitarian use licenses assure that products of research and development stay publicly available and that at the same time the incentive function of exclusive intellectual property rights are maintained.

== The intellectual property rights system ==
Humanitarian use licenses represent a tool to distribute the outcomes of research and development more equally. They relax the exclusive claims of intellectual property rights with more permissive licenses for developing countries. Intellectual property is an umbrella term for various legal entitlements which attach to certain types of information, ideas, or other intangibles in their expressed form. The term intellectual property reflects the idea that this subject matter is the product of the mind or the intellect, and that these rights may be protected by law in the same way as any other form of property.

There are several functions related to these rights that make them work as a catalyst for the market. But there are also fundamental differences between the economic and social conditions of developed countries and developing countries. Hence, conventional licensing practices have caused distortions that make humanitarian use licenses a tool worth considering.

=== Incentive function ===
The holder of a legal Intellectual Property Right is generally entitled to exclude others for a period of time. This gives the owner a comparative advantage over others for a limited time. Thus, innovative activity is rewarded, which stimulates research and development.

But many developing countries are characterized by a weak research and development sector. Of the 400,000 inventions for which patent applications are submitted annually, developing countries take part in 1 percent whereas the United States, the USSR, the Federal Republic of Germany, and Japan participate in 73 percent. (Vestry Besarovic) This makes the industrial sector of developing countries largely dependent on imitation. Universally imposed minimum standards of patent protection, as the TRIPS (Agreement on Trade-Related Aspects of Intellectual Property Rights) requires, are not likely to contribute to economic growth unless a particular level of development has been achieved (Thompson and Rushing). When developing countries have to purchase expensive technology because of a protective regime to comply with TRIPS, it can lead to the breakup of industries and thus reduce economic growth.

=== Transaction function ===
Transaction costs hinder development on whether there is a sufficient resource commitment from industry. This factor influences the relative price of a patent and its relative utility. In economies that have to rely on imitation yet clear laws are unlikely to stimulate innovation. Protection gains importance at higher stages of development when it serves to stimulate. Until this stage is reached, the relative benefits for facilitating transactions will not outweigh the relative costs of hindering technology application.

=== Disclosure function ===
Patent applications must disclose how the claimed invention functions. This disclosure allows persons skilled in the art to make use of the innovation. As new technologies are applied, further innovations can be built on existing ones.

But rates of secondary and university education are much lower in developing countries than they are in developed countries. Along with the lack of capital flows into research and development, this lowers the potential for adoption of new technology and the development of innovations. Thus, the information disclosed in a patent becomes useless, as the preconditions for taking advantage of the information do not exist in developing countries.

=== Inequalities in the global intellectual property rights system ===
The effects of the globally imbalanced power relations are best illustrated by looking at sectors strongly concerned with IPR, medicine and agriculture. These sectors are also crucial for development as they serve the basic needs of people. They can be harmful as they cover consumer products. For example, patent protection for drugs keeps the price high and inhibits competitors from introducing cheaper generic versions.

In agriculture, the patenting of genes or certain properties of crops can make the use of these crops costly and burdensome. Access to varieties that have long been used by farmers can be restricted, and as a result markets can be destroyed. An illustrative example for this is the case of the Enola bean, where a field bean variety showing a certain colour was patented. Subsequently, the licensor required all importers of Mexican beans to pay royalties, which would have caused a significant drop in export sales of beans from Mexico.

But protection may also hinder development in intermediate stages, as it covers not only final products, but also intermediate products, processes and tools to create those products. Thus, protections covering biotechnology can decrease the development of and access to new technologies in developing countries, thus preventing new crops or drugs from being developed.

Moreover, drugs for tropical diseases and crops adapted to tropical conditions have been developed only to a limited extent. The purchasing power in these countries is low and thus there are no lucrative markets. Although only 10% of the global disease load occurs within industrialised countries, 90 percent of global drug investment goes toward the drugs for industrialized countries. Projects that address diseases of developing countries such as malaria and tuberculosis receive comparatively little funding.

=== Stimulating research and development ===
Technologies can be provided that stimulate the development of needed and to local conditions adapted products. Companies and research institutes in the specific countries are able to produce and develop at lower costs and know the local needs and problems best. Technology can benefit the poor farmer or the sick people that are in need of drugs or food as well as the economy as a whole.

=== Providing consumer products ===
Humanitarian Use Licenses have the potential to enhance the supply of important consumer products. When cheap or cost-free licenses are granted to companies in developing countries, it would be possible for them to produce copies of drugs or seeds to provide the population with. Apart from missing royalty payments companies in developing countries will possibly be able to produce and distribute at a much lower price than companies in wealthier countries.

== How it works ==
Defining the population that should benefit and the institutions that can serve the needs of this population is required in the humanitarian use licensing scheme. Depending on the different technologies that should be assigned via the Humanitarian Use License, there are different approaches of how to formulate a Humanitarian Use License:

- Assigning a non-exclusive license means to retain the freedom to assign licenses also to other parties. The terms under which additional licensing is provided can be fixed beforehand, thus securing the situation for the licensee. This could mean that the licensor is only permitted to assign additional licenses to countries in certain regions or that are i.e. classified as least developed countries.
- Public-private partnerships are projects that private sector companies and the government jointly fund and operate. Governmental involvement can be seen as giving an incentive for private companies to engage in activities that they otherwise would not have carried out. Transferring technology to public private partnerships for product development for neglected markets or neglected diseases is a way of facilitating the work and enabling them the development of adapted products.
- For the development of adapted technologies a direct partnership between companies, universities or research institutions of developed and developing countries can be established. Partners in developing countries will have a greater interest to meet the needs of these countries.
- Governments or foundations that fund research can require that the outcomes will be free for humanitarian licensing. The establishment of those clauses secures that later negotiations will be held with clear expectations.
- Measuring the progress and the impact of a project, for example, the condition that on or before the date of the first phase of a clinical trial for a new drug, the licensee will have identified a generic manufacturer in a middle-income country to produce the licensed technology at a reasonable price for developing countries. Subsequently, if this milestone is not met, other provisions and reservations in the agreement would be triggered, for example loss of exclusivity, sublicensing, exercise of march-in rights, and even termination of the agreement. (Brewster, Chapman, Hansen)
- Access to a product can be assured when the licensor requires that products are sold at the markets in developing countries to a price, people can afford there. an appropriate price may be set by having a small profit of about 5-10%.
- Stimulating the research of products that are adapted to the conditions in developing countries can be achieved when clauses that exclude particular categories of research from infringement are integrated into licensing agreements.
- By including reach through clauses, new technologies, based on the licensed one, will be treated under the same licensing conditions that cover the original license. Thus, intermediate technologies, genes or processes can be maintained available for licensing for humanitarian licensing.
- A “non suit” agreement is an agreement that an intellectual property holder will not assert these rights against one or more parties to the agreement. (Kaplan) The advantage for institutions or companies granting innovations is that they won't have to fear any liability by using these clauses. For example, companies may hesitate to grant i.e. genetic material to research institutions, as they might fear any claims that can be made based on international agreements like the Cartagena protocol, that force companies into the responsibility to care for the material they distribute.

== Benefits for the supplier ==
Exclusive claims that are connected with intellectual property rights might cause companies to fear loss of revenues. However, this is not necessarily the case, as mostly non-commercial markets are served. People are provided with royalty free goods that otherwise would not have made the purchase in the first place.

Donating technology and support for developing countries will create positive publicity for companies that do so, especially in the biotechnology and medical sectors. This can be reinforced if also governments take a role in this. Promoting positive publicity by giving prices or tax incentives are possible ways to reward companies that are engaged in underserved sectors.

Many developing countries have a growing potential private market for technologies. The technology supplier may plan to develop these growing markets as part of a long-term market strategy, implying that the supplier expects these currently unprofitable markets to become profitable in the future. Thus, the supplier can create a loyal customer base in the future with a generous donation today (IP strategies 2001)

== Disadvantages ==
Humanitarian use licences could be compulsorily assigned by the government or subject to voluntary implementation by the patent holder. However, developing standards in humanitarian licensing that encourages also private companies to technology transfers would rather stimulate the voluntarily engagement of the private sector in development. Thus, resources would be directed into more productive channels than compulsory licensing could do. Building trust of partners can be achieved by careful drafted clauses that a rights holder could choose to include in licensing agreements.

The cost of such a failure depends on how many farmers included in the target would have purchased the technology from the market had they not been granted preferential access (IP strategy 2001). A trade-off between the effort to administer the targeting scheme and the size of leakage is probable – the lower the risk of leakage should be, the higher will be the cost of implementation of these targeting schemes. Of particular concern are countries with a wide income disparity, where for example viable commercial markets may exist in the cities, while rural areas are underserved and require a humanitarian license and a significantly different price-point.

== Fields of application ==
Humanitarian use licenses should be considered in every stage of development as there could be restrictions to the access to materials, processes for product development or final products. Patents can be granted with respect to whole varieties, single genes or procedures that permit the isolation of genes. Humanitarian Use Licenses therefore do not only concern companies that bring products to the market and could via such licenses directly deliver people in need. It has to be considered also by universities, national and international agricultural research centres and public-private partnerships whose work represents the basis for further upstream research.

== Literature ==
- Intellectual Property Rights in the global economy. Maskus, K., Institute for International Economics, Washington DC.
- Facilitating Humanitarian Access to Pharmaceutical and Agricultural Innovation. In: Innovation Strategy Today, Vol. 1, 3 – 2005, Brewster, Amanda L., Chapman, Audrey R., Hansen Stephen A. – Web: https://web.archive.org/web/20060827041644/http://www.biodevelopments.org/innovation/ist3.pdf
- Technology Transfer for Humanitarian Use: Economic issues and market segmentation approaches. In: Innovation Strategy Today, 5 – 2002 Lybbert, Travis J. – Web: https://web.archive.org/web/20060615173342/http://www.biodevelopments.org/ip/ipst5.pdf
- Exploring a Humanitarian Use Exemption to Intellectual Property Protections: Report from Meeting 1 of the SIPPI Humanitarian Licensing Working Group, July 13–14, 2004 – Web: http://sippi.aaas.org/meetings/#hue
- Science and Intellectual Property in the Public Interest, Exploring a Humanitarian Use Exemption to Intellectual Property Protections. Kaplan, W. – Web: http://www.who.int/intellectualproperty/studies/W.Kaplan2.pdf
- Using IP Agreements to promote the objectives of Public Private Partnerships in developing affordable products for developing countries. Kaplan, W –
- Legal aspects of the transfer of technology in modern society. Vestry Besarovic, in: Science and technology in the transformation of the world. The United Nations University – http://www.unu.edu/unupress/unupbooks/uu01se/uu01se00.htm#Contents
- Evolution of Capacity for Institutionalized Management of Intellectual Property at International Agricultural Research Centers: A Strategic Case Study. Egelyng, H. – http://www.agbioforum.org/v8n1/v8n1a02-egelyng.htm
