= Freiburg Institute for Advanced Studies =

Research college of the University of Freiburg

Coordinates: 48°00′05″N 7°51′00″E

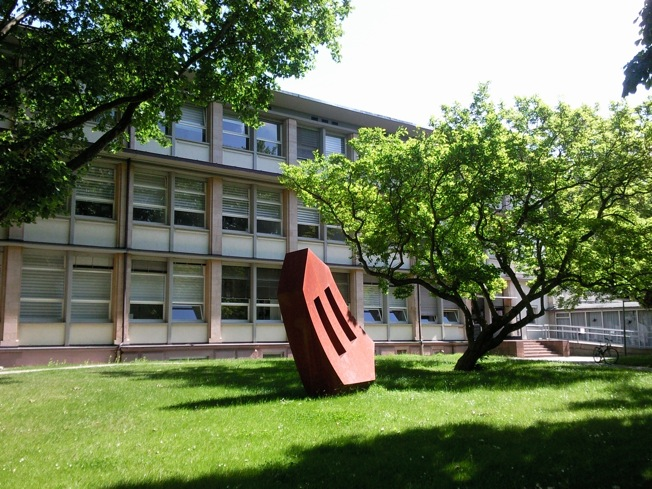
The FRIAS main building, located in the institutes quarter of the university.

The Freiburg Institute for Advanced Studies (FRIAS) is the international research college of the University of Freiburg, Germany. The institute was initially part of the university's proposal for funding in the Excellence Initiative in 2007, an initiative by the German Federal Ministry of Education and Research and the German Research Foundation with the aim of promoting both cutting-edge research and enhancing the international success of German higher education institutions.

After the University of Freiburg had been chosen as one of nine "universities of excellence", FRIAS officially took up operations on 1 April 2008. It aims to promote high-level research, develop interdisciplinary research fields, and assist young researchers in their development. FRIAS is loosely modeled after other similar institutions, such as the Institute for Advanced Study in Princeton, New Jersey, whose director Prof. Dr. Peter Goddard held the inaugural address at the official presentation of FRIAS in May, 2008 at the University of Freiburg. The University of Freiburg has applied for FRIAS's funding to be continued in the second round of the Excellence Initiative.

== Objectives ==
A new institution in the German higher education and research landscape, FRIAS invites renowned researchers from German and international institutions to conduct their research in Freiburg, while aiming to give its researchers extensive freedoms to pursue projects of their choice with minimal bureaucracy. As a haven and center for academic research, FRIAS wishes to promote new synergies among its fellows and give new impulses to the University of Freiburg. FRIAS pursues the following objectives:

- to support top-level researchers
- to promote young academics
- to facilitate interdisciplinary contact and collaboration
- to reinforce the university's international networking and visibility

== Structure ==
The Freiburg Institute for Advanced Studies consisted 2008-2013 of four schools (School of History, School of Language and Literature, School of Life Sciences - LIFENET, School of Soft Matter Research), which mirror important research areas at the University of Freiburg. Since 2013 they are replaced with an open structure for all academic disciplines. With the beginning of the academic year 2014/2015, FRIAS will also concentrate on yearly two research foci.

== Fellows' academic activities ==
Three groups of fellows work at FRIAS:

- Internal Senior Fellows: academics from the University of Freiburg
- External Senior Fellows: academics from all over the world
- Junior Fellows: outstanding young academics

FRIAS organises academic colloquia, workshops and international conferences in its research areas. Research results are published in specialist journals, monographs and FRIAS's own journal series.

Soon after its conception, the Hermann Staudinger Lectures were introduced, named after the famous University of Freiburg chemist who won the Nobel Prize in 1953. Renowned scientists from all over the world, so far including Douglas Osheroff, Jean-Marie Lehn, Richard R. Ernst, and Werner Arber, are invited to hold this lecture.

Since its foundation in 2008, more than 250 researchers have worked at FRIAS. The fellows are released from their teaching and administrative duties, and substitutes are engaged to fulfil their teaching commitments. The substitute professorships financed by FRIAS are, in many cases, used to promote young academics that have recently qualified as professors.

== Promotion of early-stage researchers ==
Junior Fellows have the opportunity to organise their own conferences at FRIAS and invite international guests to attend, as well as the chance to teach and obtain their professorial qualification (Habilitation) at the university.

Doctoral candidates and postdoctoral researchers at the University of Freiburg are able to take part in Young Researchers’ Contests and apply for research prizes with their doctoral and habilitation theses.

== Interdisciplinary activities ==
The major FRIAS interdisciplinary symposia each focus on a topic from the different perspectives of the humanities, social sciences and natural sciences (2009: Evolution, 2011: Catastrophes). Smaller, inter-school event formats such as monthly Dinner Speeches and After Hours Conversations provide opportunities for interdisciplinary exchange.

== International collaboration ==
A multitude of permanent research networks and projects have developed from collaborations between internal and external fellows. In the upper Rhine area, close relationships exist with the Institut d'Études Avancées de Strasbourg and the University of Basel.

In October 2010, FRIAS organised a conference on the topic of "University-Based Institutes for Advanced Study (UBIAS) in a Global Perspective: Promises, Challenges, New Frontiers", in which a total of 32 Institutes for Advanced Study from 19 countries participated. An independent UBIAS network, with member institutes from around the globe, was established as a result of this.

== See also ==
- University of Freiburg
- University of Freiburg Faculty of Biology
- Freiburg im Breisgau
