= Syrette =

Liquid injection device

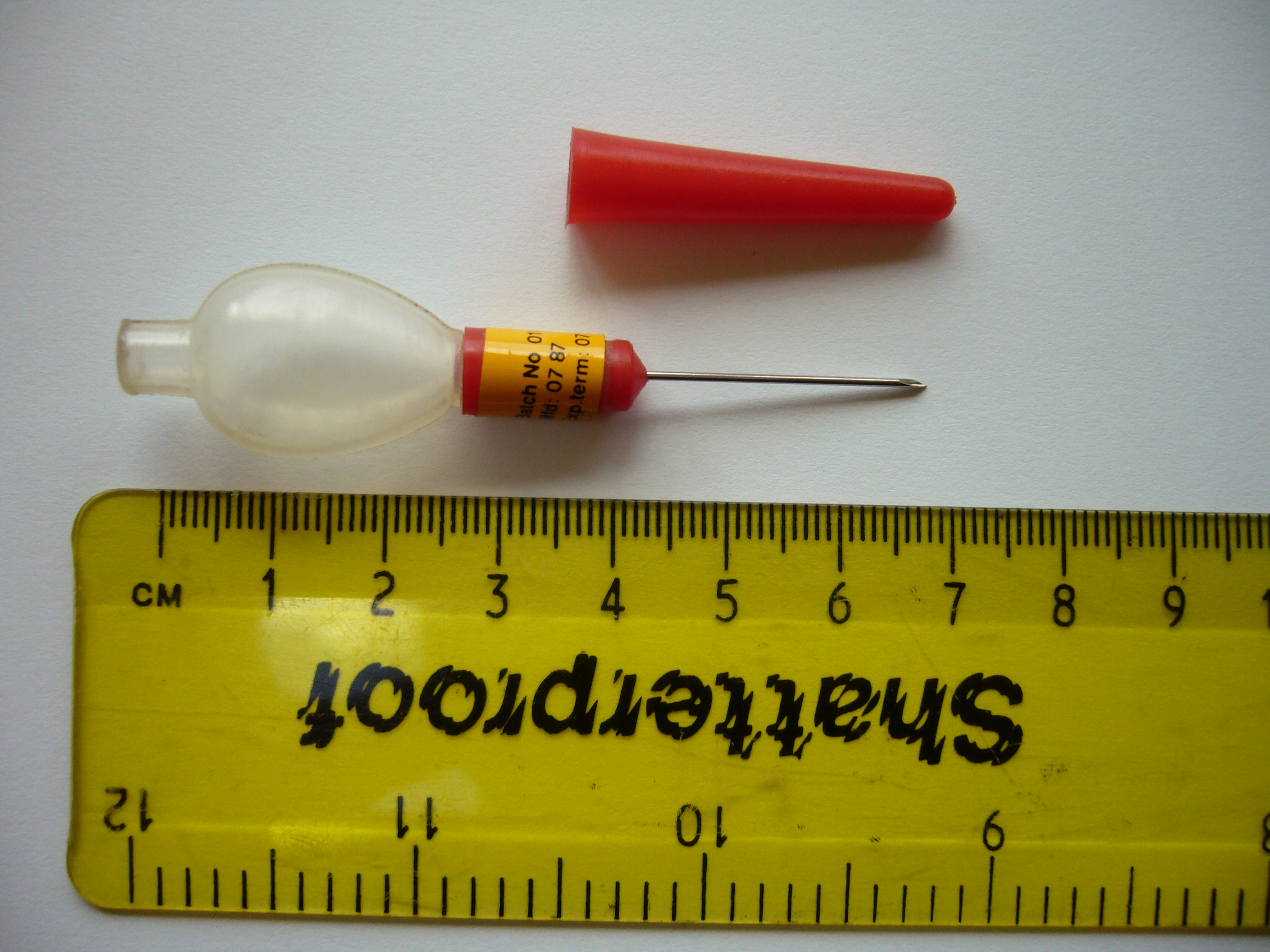
British syrette containing Omnopon, c. 1990s

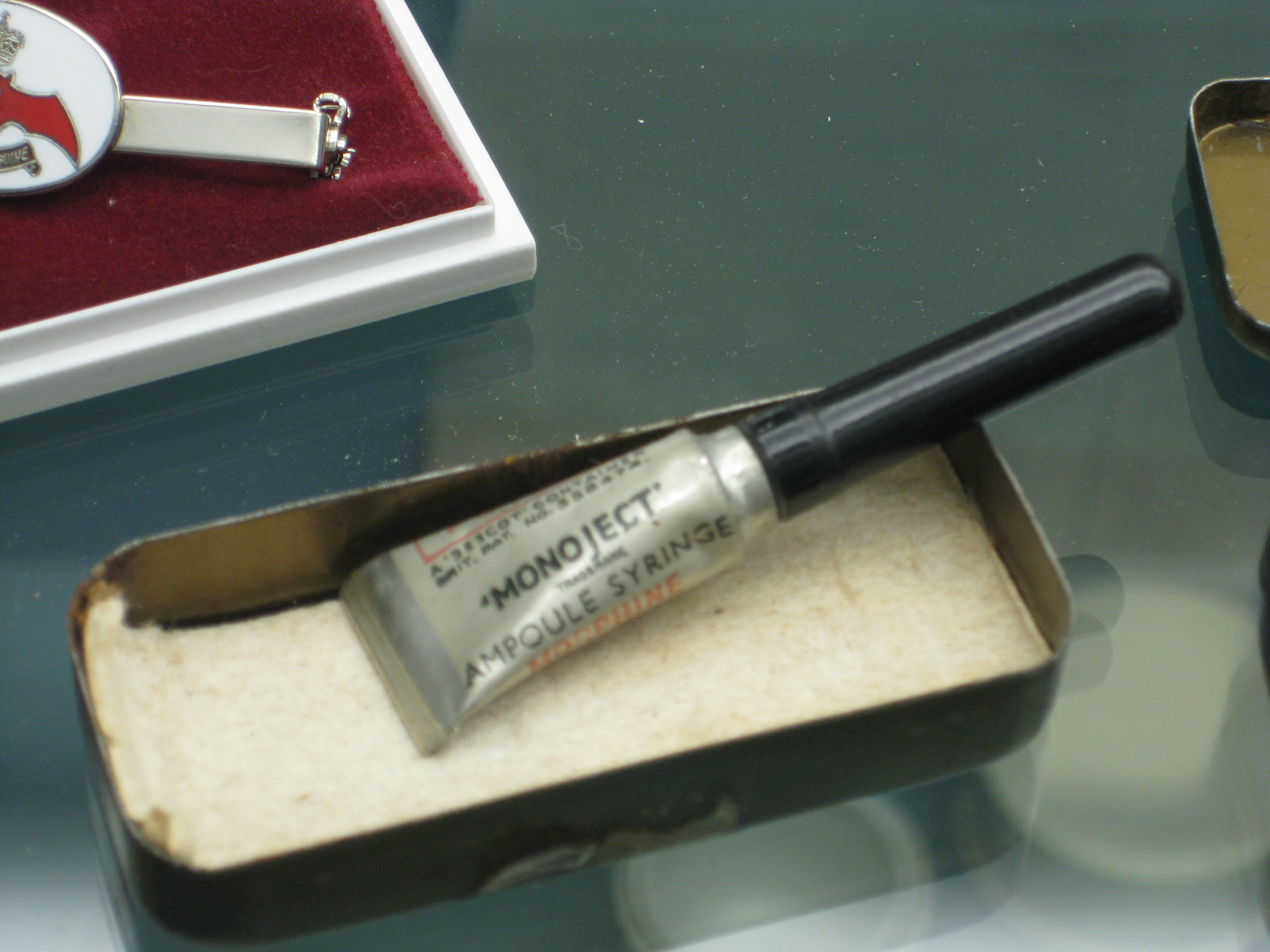
Syrette of morphine from World War II, on display at the Army Medical Services Museum

A syrette is a single-use device for injecting liquid through a needle. It is similar to a syringe except that it has a sealed squeeze tube instead of a rigid tube and piston. It was developed by the pharmaceutical manufacturer E.R. Squibb & Sons (eventually merged into the current day Bristol-Myers Squibb) just prior to World War II (WWII).

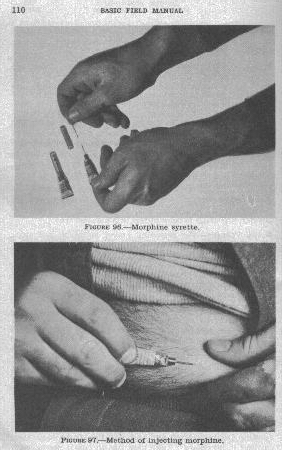
Instructions for using the syrette from the FM 21-11 Basic Field Manual – First Aid for Soldiers, April 7, 1943

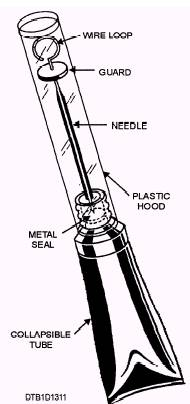
Diagram showing wire loop pin

In WWII, the morphine syrette was included in first aid kits. It had a wire loop with a guard at the end of a hollow needle that was used to break a seal where the needle was attached to the tube. The wire loop was then removed and the needle was inserted under the skin at a shallow angle and the tube slowly squeezed from the sealed end (see subcutaneous injection). After injection the used tube was often pinned to the receiving soldier's collar to inform others of the dose administered.

The syrette was adopted for use by the United States Army in 1940. The US military also distributed atropine in syrettes. Chemical treatment was subsequently distributed in autoinjector form.

== See also ==
- Uniject
