= Physical crystallography before X-rays =

History of physical crystallography to 1895

Physical crystallography before X-rays describes how physical crystallography developed as a science up to the discovery of X-rays by Wilhelm Conrad Röntgen in 1895. In the period before X-rays, crystallography can be divided into three broad areas: geometrical crystallography culminating in the discovery of the 230 space groups in 1891–1894, chemical crystallography and physical crystallography.

Physical crystallography is concerned with the physical properties of crystals, such as their optical, electrical, magnetic, thermal, and mechanical properties.

- The interaction between crystals and electromagnetic radiation is covered in the following sections: double refraction, rotary polarization, conical refraction, absorption and pleochroism, luminescence, reflection from opaque materials, and infrared optics.
- The effect of electricity and magnetism on crystals is covered in: electrical conduction, magnetic properties, and dielectric properties.
- The effect of temperature change on crystals is covered in: thermal expansion, thermal conduction, thermoelectricity, and pyroelectricity.
- The effect of mechanical force on crystals is covered in: elasticity, photoelasticity, and piezoelectricity.

The study of crystals in the time before X-rays was focused more on their geometry and mathematical analysis than their physical properties. Unlike geometrical crystallography, the history of physical crystallography has no central story, but is a collection of developments in different areas.

== Symmetry ==
During the 19th century crystallography was progressively transformed into an empirical and mathematical science by the adoption of symmetry concepts. In 1832 Franz Ernst Neumann used symmetry considerations when studying double refraction. Woldemar Voigt, who was a student of Neumann, in 1885 formalized Neumann's principle as "if a crystal is invariant with respect to certain symmetry operations, any of its physical properties must also be invariant with respect to the same symmetry operations". Neumann's principle is sometimes referred to as the Neumann–Minnigerode–Curie principle based on later work by Bernhard Minnigerode (another student of Neumann) and Pierre Curie. Curie's principle "the symmetries of the causes are to be found in the effects" is a generalization of Neumann's principle. At the end of the 19th century Voigt introduced tensor calculus to model the physical properties of anisotropic crystals.

== Interaction with electromagnetic radiation ==
=== Double refraction ===
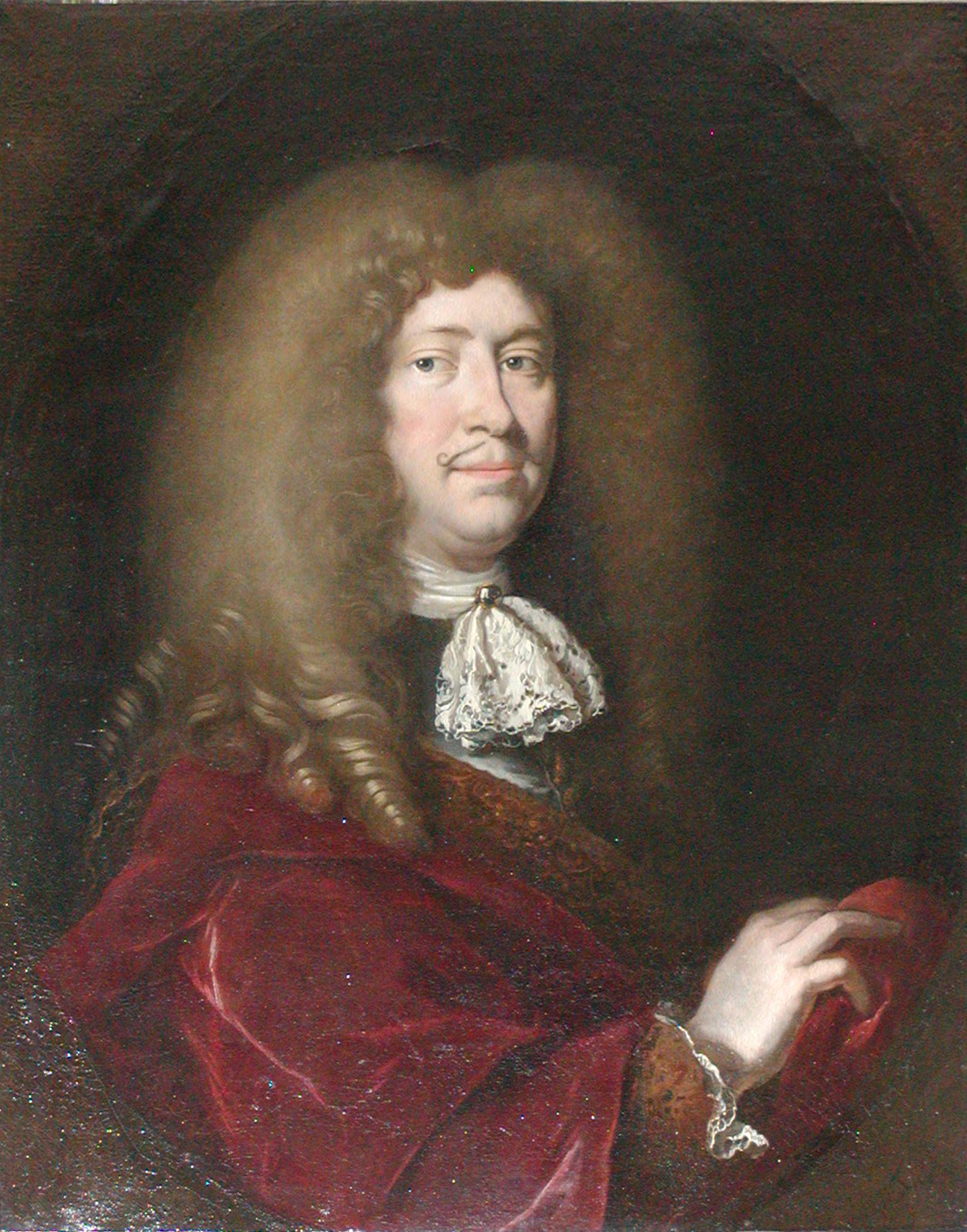
Rasmus Bartholin

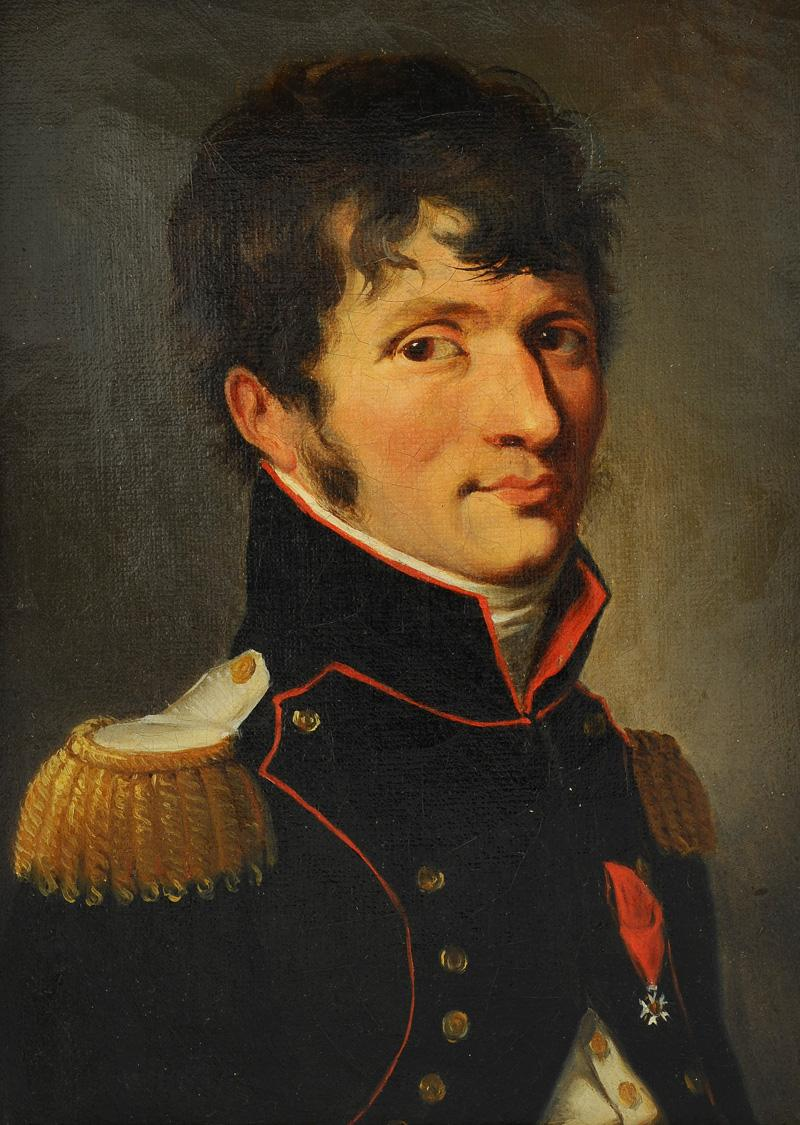
Étienne-Louis Malus

Christiaan Huygens

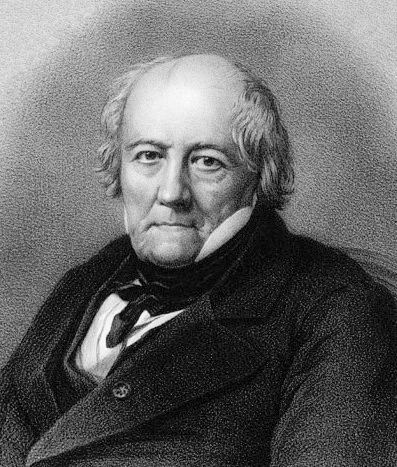
Jean-Baptiste Biot

Researchers in double refraction

Double refraction occurs when a ray of light incident upon a birefringent material, is split by polarization into two rays taking slightly different paths. The double refraction and rhomboidal cleavage of crystals of calcite, or Iceland spar, were first recorded in 1669 by Rasmus Bartholin In 1690 Christiaan Huygens analyzed double refraction in his book Traité de la lumière. Huygens reasoned that the cleavage rhombohedron resulted from the stacking of spherical particles and that the peculiarities of the transmission of light can be traced to the particular asymmetry of the crystal.

In 1810 Étienne-Louis Malus determined that natural light, too, when reflected through a certain angle, behaves like one of the rays exiting a double-refracting crystal. Malus called this phenomenon polarization. In 1812 Jean-Baptiste Biot defined optically positive and negative crystals for the first time. In 1819 David Brewster found that all crystals could be classified as isotropic, uniaxial or biaxial. Augustin-Jean Fresnel was a significant researcher in the whole field of crystal optics, and published a detailed paper on double refraction in 1827 in which he described the phenomenon in terms of polarization, understanding light as a wave with field components in transverse polarization. Crystal optics was an active research area during the 19th century and comprehensive accounts of the field were published by Lazarus Fletcher (1891), Theodor Liebisch (1891) and Friedrich Pockels (1906).

=== Rotary polarization ===
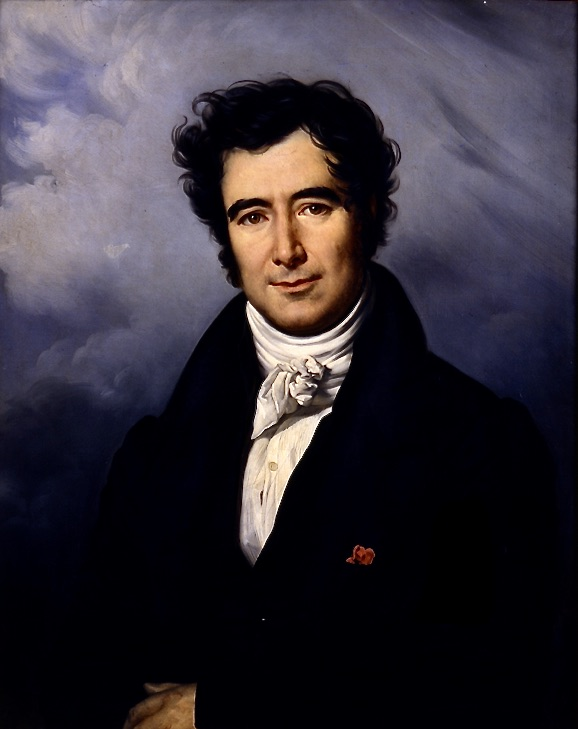
François Arago

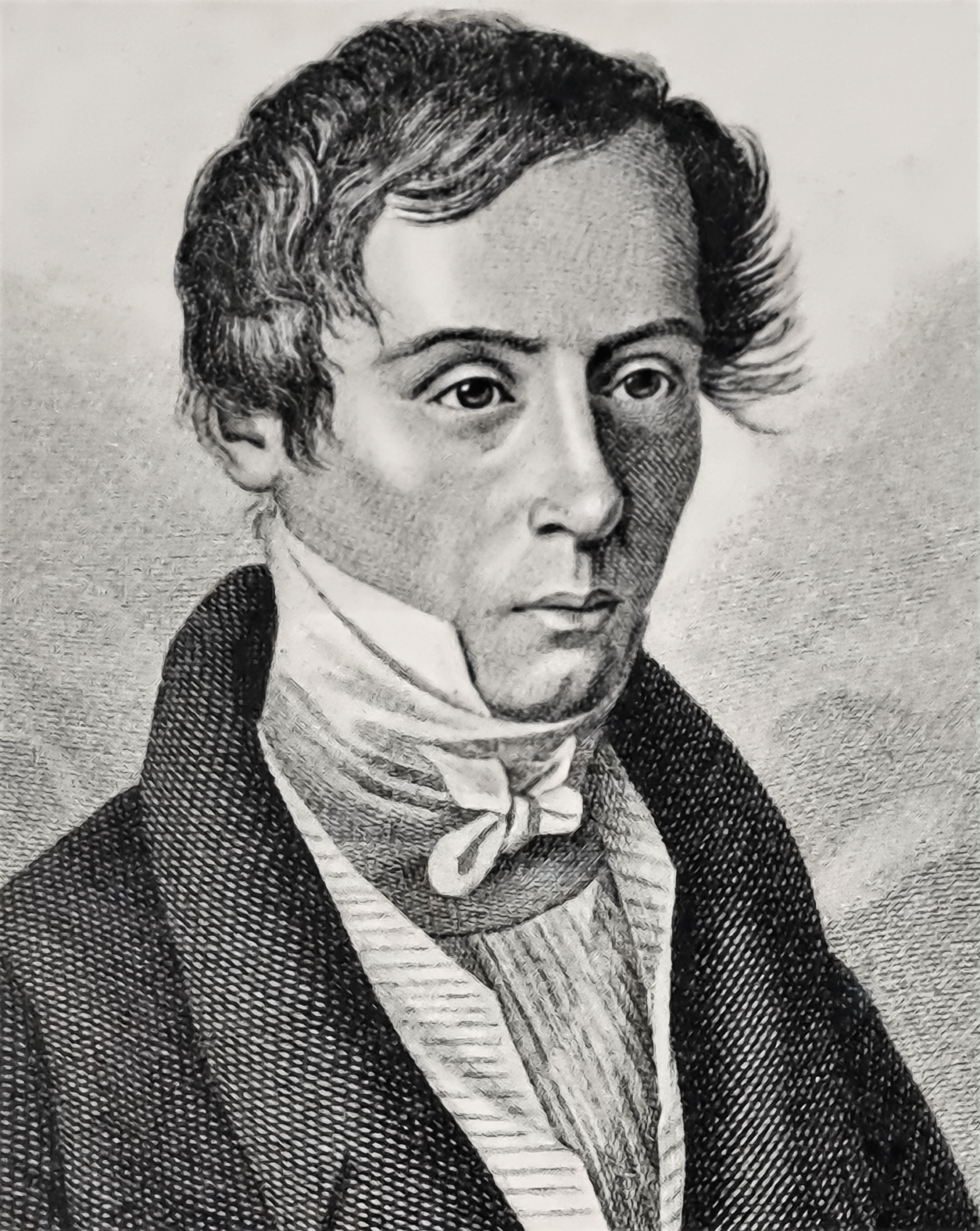
Augustin-Jean Fresnel

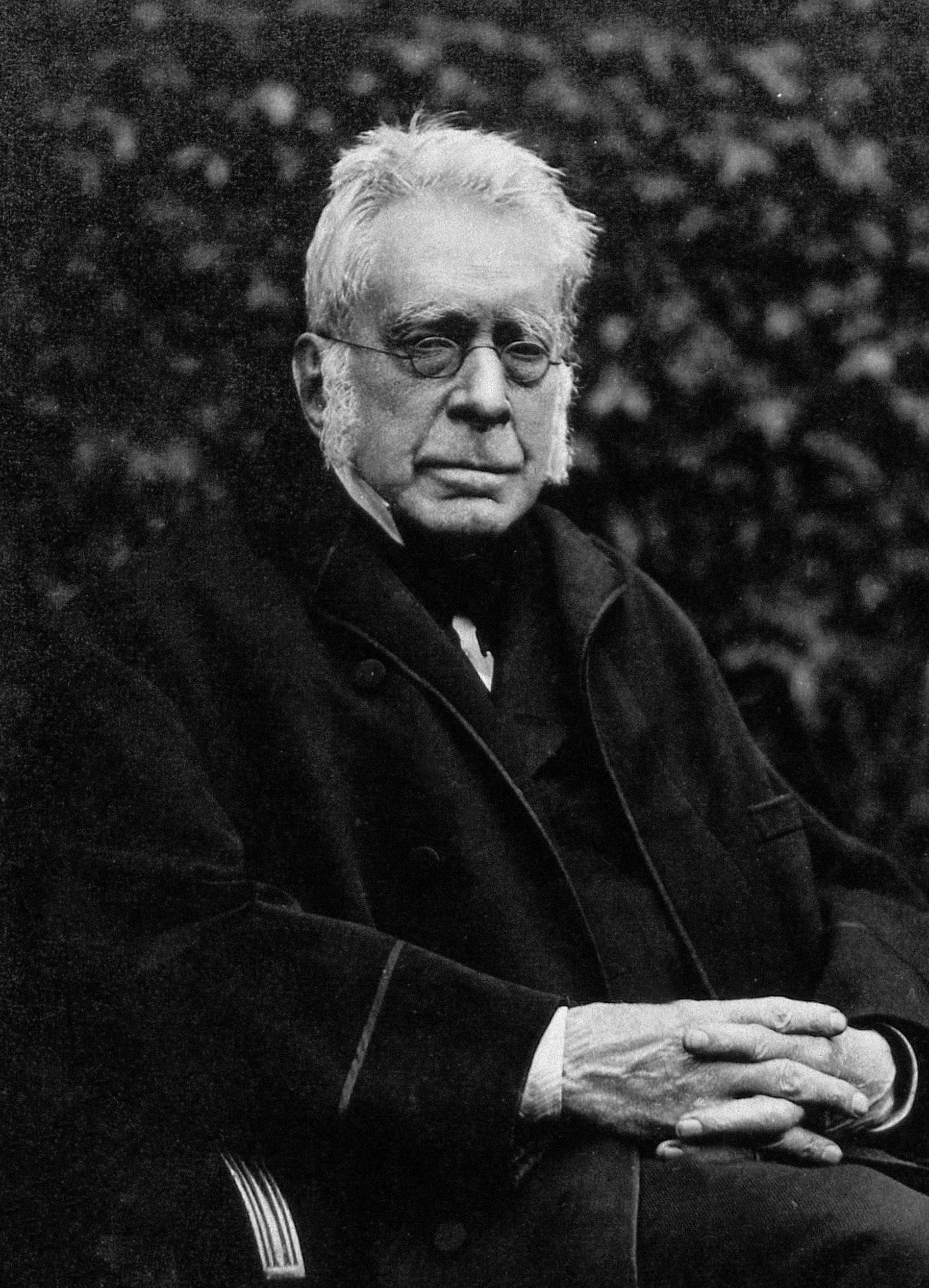
George Biddell Airy

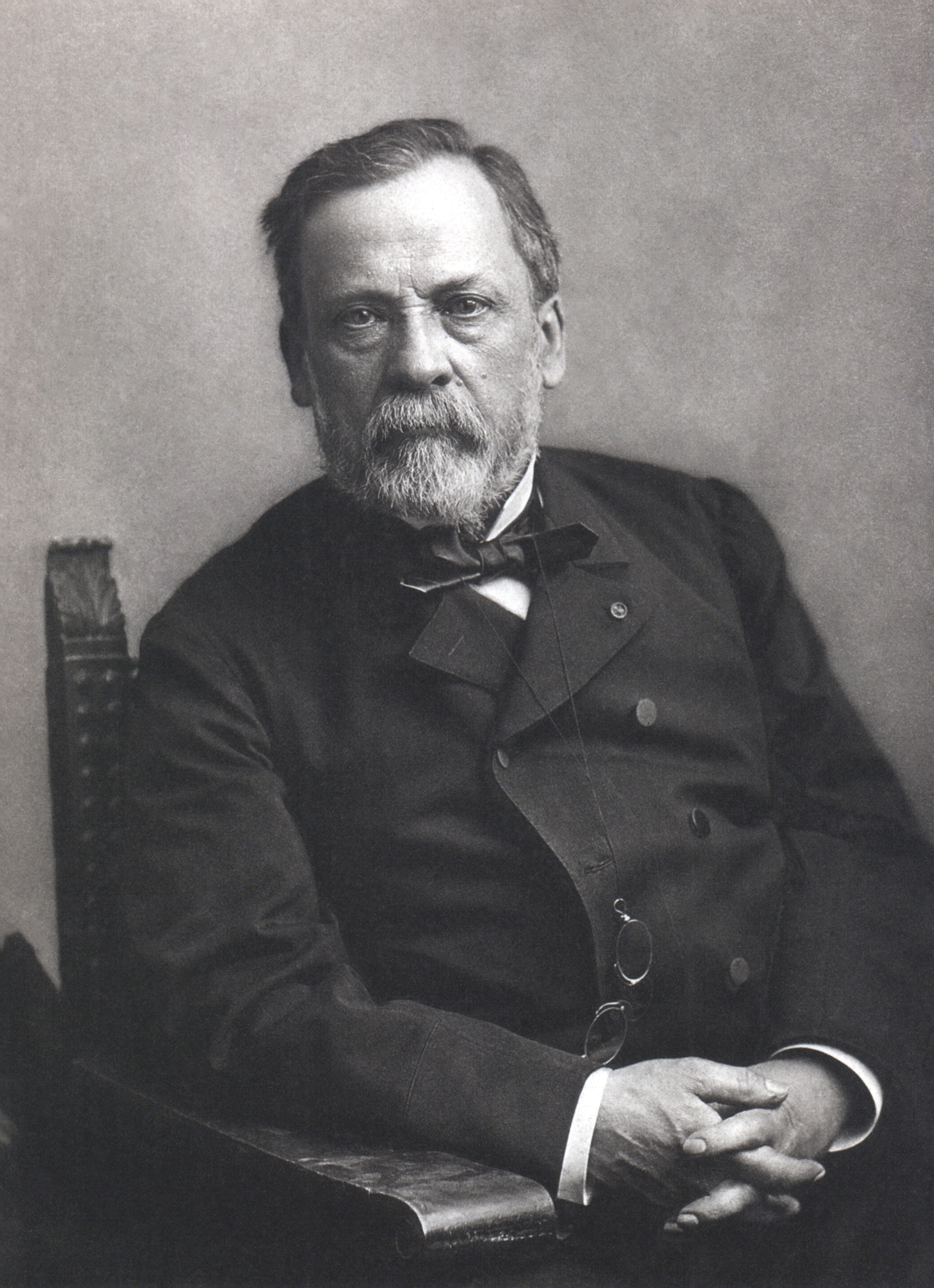
Louis Pasteur

Researchers in rotary polarization

In 1811 François Arago, who favoured the corpuscular theory of light, discovered the rotation of the plane of polarization of light travelling through quartz. In 1812 Jean-Baptiste Biot, who favoured the wave theory of light, enunciated the laws of rotary polarization and their application to the analysis of various substances. Biot discovered that while some crystals rotate the light to the right others rotate it to the left, and determined that the rotation is proportional to the thickness of substance traversed and to the wavelength of the light.

In 1821 John Herschel pointed out the relation between the direction of rotation and the development of faces on quartz crystals. Suspecting that rotatory polarization is an effect of a lack of symmetry, Herschel established that quartz crystals often present faces placed in such a way that those belonging to certain crystals are mirror images of the corresponding faces of other crystals. He explained the connection between this arrangement and the respective rotation of light to the right and to the left. In 1822 Augustin-Jean Fresnel explained the rotation by postulating oppositely circularly polarized beams travelling with different velocities along the optic axis. In 1831 George Biddell Airy gave an explanation of the formation of the spirals which bear his name. In 1846 Michael Faraday discovered that the plane of polarization may also be rotated when light passes through an isotropic medium when it is in a magnetic field. The corresponding Kerr effect can be observed on reflecting plane-polarized light from a polished ferromagnetic mirror when in a magnetized state.

In 1848 Louis Pasteur gave the general relation between crystal morphology and rotatory polarization. Pasteur solved the mystery of polarized light acting differently with chemically identical crystals and solutions. Pasteur discovered the phenomenon of molecular asymmetry, that is that molecules could be chiral and exist as a pair of enantiomers. Pasteur's method was to physically separate the crystals of a racemic mixture of sodium ammonium tartrate into right- and left-handed crystals, and then dissolve them to make two separate solutions which rotated polarized light in opposite directions.

In 1855 Christian August Hermann Marbach discovered that crystals of sodium chlorate, sodium bromate, sodium ammonium sulfate and sodium amyl acetate have the property of rotating the polarization plane. In 1857 Alfred Des Cloizeaux advanced a general theory of rotatory polarization whilst studying cinnabar and strychnine sulphate. In 1864 Josef Stefan introduced the banded spectrum in the study of rotatory polarization. Theories of magnetic optics in ferromagnetic crystals were published in 1892 by D. A. Goldhammer, and in 1893 by Paul Drude.

=== Conical refraction ===
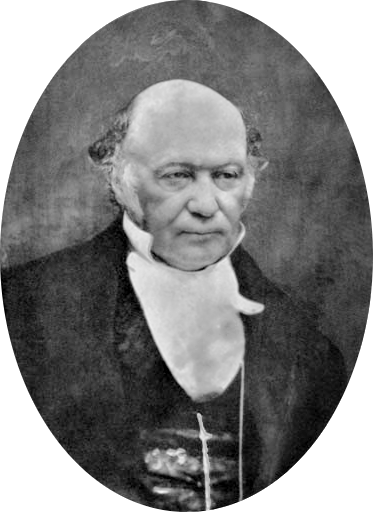
William Rowan Hamilton

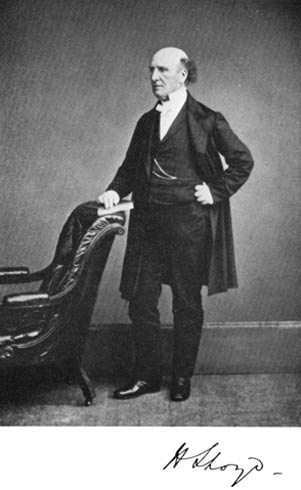
Humphrey Lloyd

Researchers in conical refraction

Conical refraction is an optical phenomenon in which a ray of light, passing through a biaxial crystal along certain directions, is refracted into a hollow cone of light. There are two possible conical refractions, one internal and one external.

In 1821–1822 Augustin-Jean Fresnel developed a theory of double refraction in both uniaxial and biaxial crystals. Fresnel derived the equation for the wavevector surface in 1823, and André-Marie Ampère rederived it in 1828. Many others investigated the wavevector surface of the biaxial crystal, but they all missed its physical implications.

William Rowan Hamilton, in his work on Hamiltonian optics, discovered the wavevector surface has four conoidal points and four tangent conics. This implies that, under certain conditions, a ray of light could be refracted into a cone of light within the crystal. He termed this phenomenon "conical refraction" and predicted two distinct types: internal and external, corresponding respectively to the conoidal points and tangent conics. Hamilton announced his discovery on 22 October 1832. He then asked Humphrey Lloyd to prove his theory experimentally. Lloyd first observed conical refraction on 14 December 1832 with a specimen of aragonite, and published his results in early 1833. In 1833 James MacCullagh claimed that Hamilton's work was a special case of a theorem he had published in 1830. Hamilton also exchanged letters with George Biddell Airy who was skeptical that conical refraction could be observed experimentally but became convinced after Lloyd's report.

Hamilton and Lloyd's discovery was a significant victory for the wave theory of light and solidified Fresnel's theory of double refraction. The discovery of conical refraction is an example of a mathematical prediction being subsequently verified by experiment.

Later theoretical work on conical refraction was published in 1860 by Robert Bellamy Clifton and in 1874 by Jules Antoine Lissajous, and experimental work in 1888 by Theodor Liebisch and in 1889 by Albrecht Schrauf.

=== Absorption and pleochroism ===
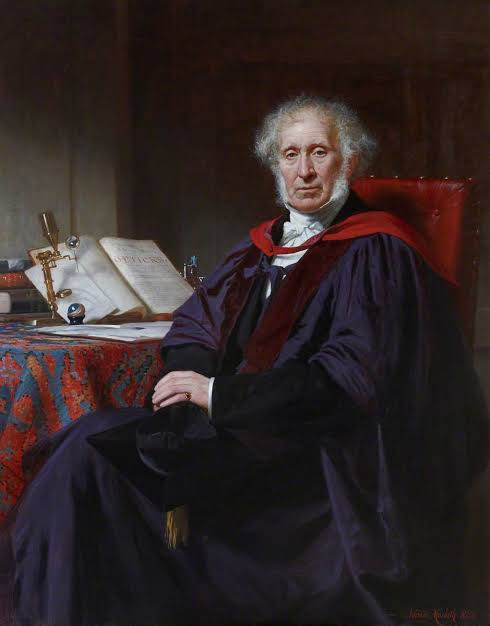
David Brewster

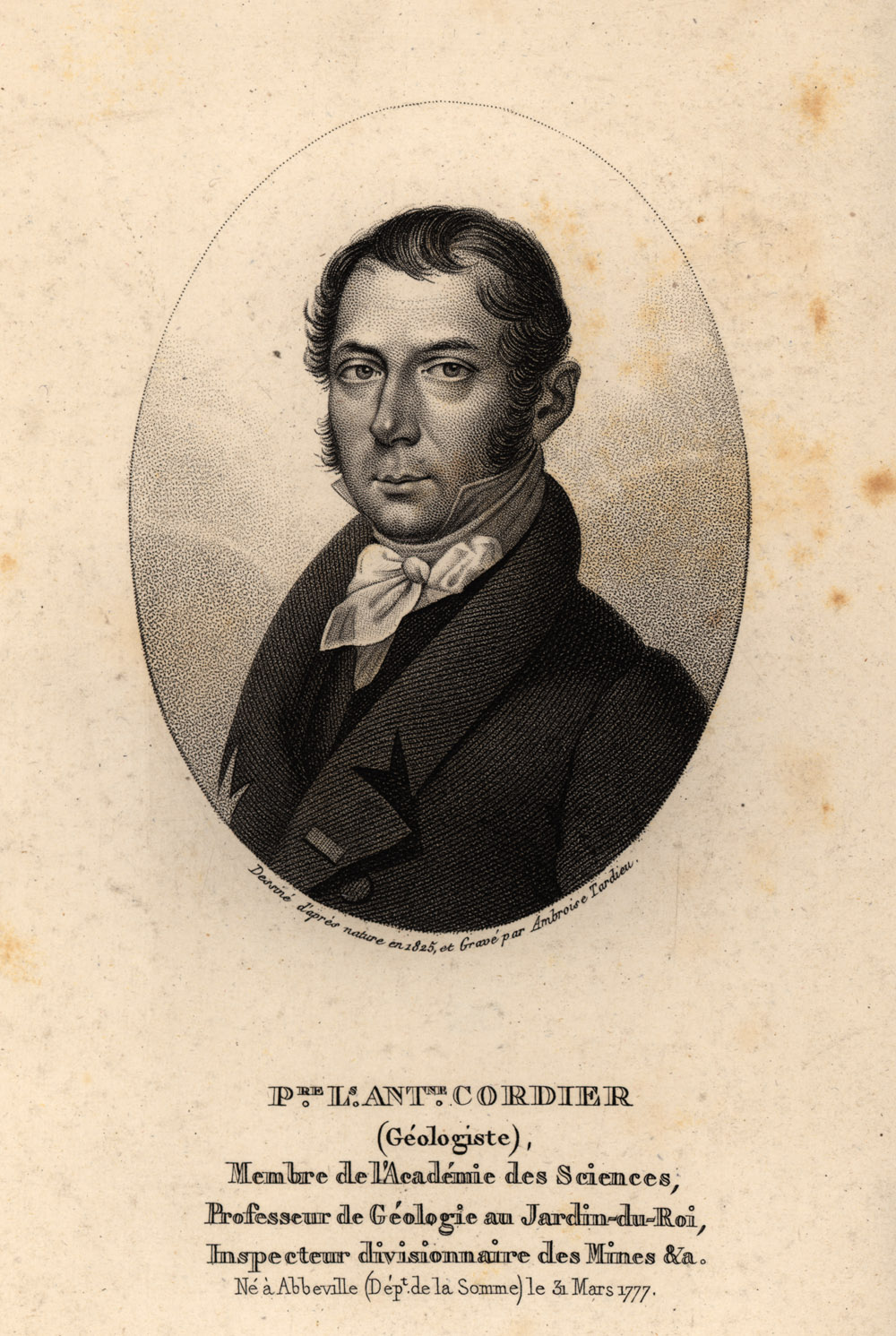
Louis Cordier

Researchers in absorption and pleochroism

In 1809 Louis Cordier discovered the phenomenon of pleochroism while investigating a new mineral that he named dichröıte (cordierite), whereby its crystals showed different colors when viewed along different axes. From 1817 to 1819 David Brewster made a systematic study of light absorption and pleochroism in various minerals and showed that, in uniaxial crystals, the absorption is smallest in the direction of, and greatest at right angles to, the optical axis. In 1820 John Herschel studied the absorption of light in biaxial crystals and explained the interference rings first observed by David Brewster. In 1838 Jacques Babinet discovered that the greatest absorption in a crystal generally coincided with the direction of greatest refractive index. In 1845 Wilhelm Haidinger published a general account of pleochroism in crystals. In 1854 Henri Hureau de Sénarmont showed that transparent crystals stained by a dye during crystal growth became pleochroic.

In 1877 Paul Glan performed photometric observations on absorption. In 1880 Hugo Laspeyres pointed out the existence of absorption axes (directions of least, intermediate, and greatest absorption). He investigated certain biaxial crystals and found that the absorption axes, although subject to the symmetry of the crystal, did not necessarily coincide with the principal directions of the indicatrix. In 1888 Henri Becquerel made qualitative and quantitative observations. Woldemar Voigt (1885) and Paul Drude (1890) presented theories of the absorption of light in crystals. In 1906 Friedrich Pockels published his Lehrbuch der Kristalloptik which gave an overview of the subject.

=== Luminescence ===
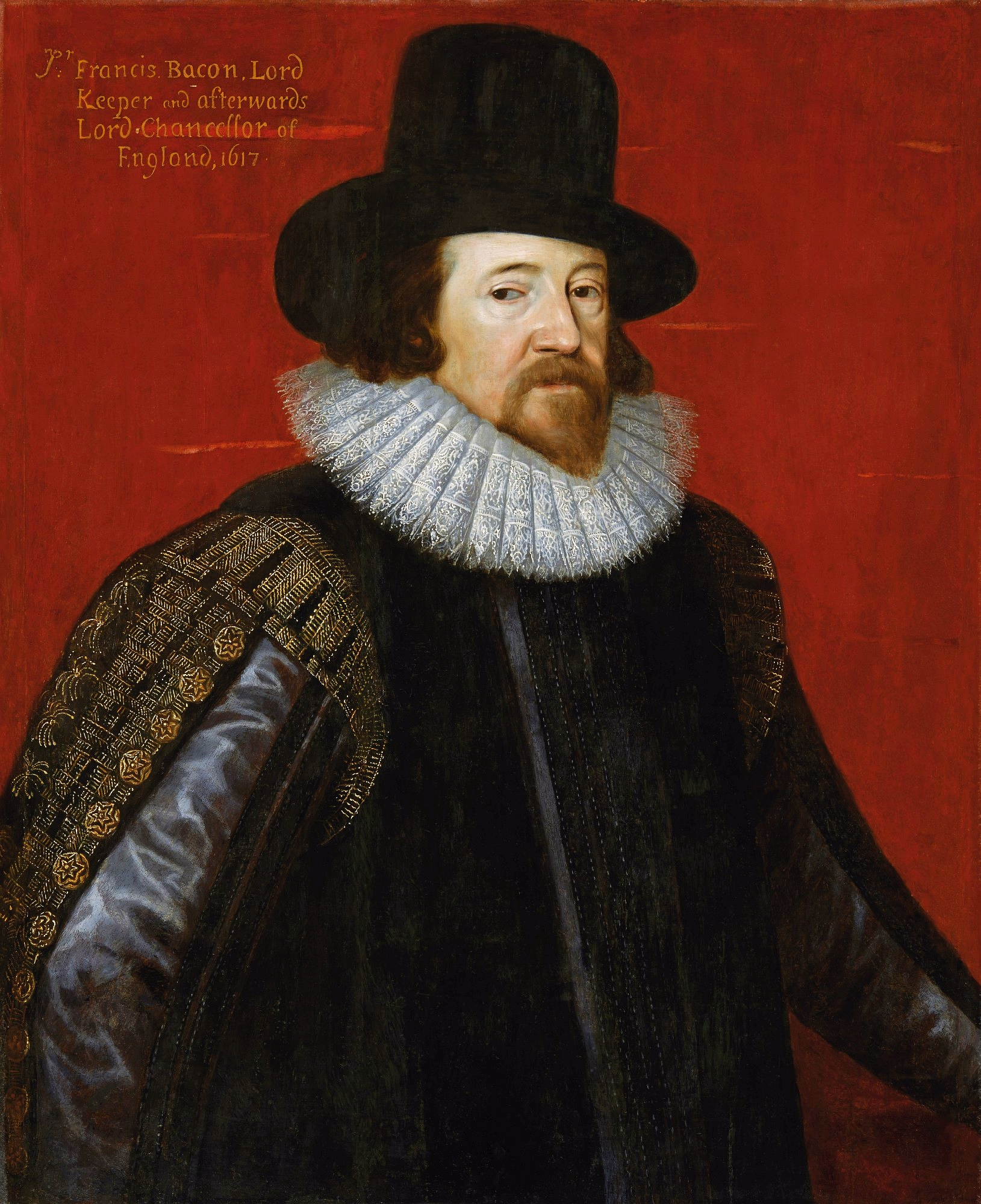
Francis Bacon

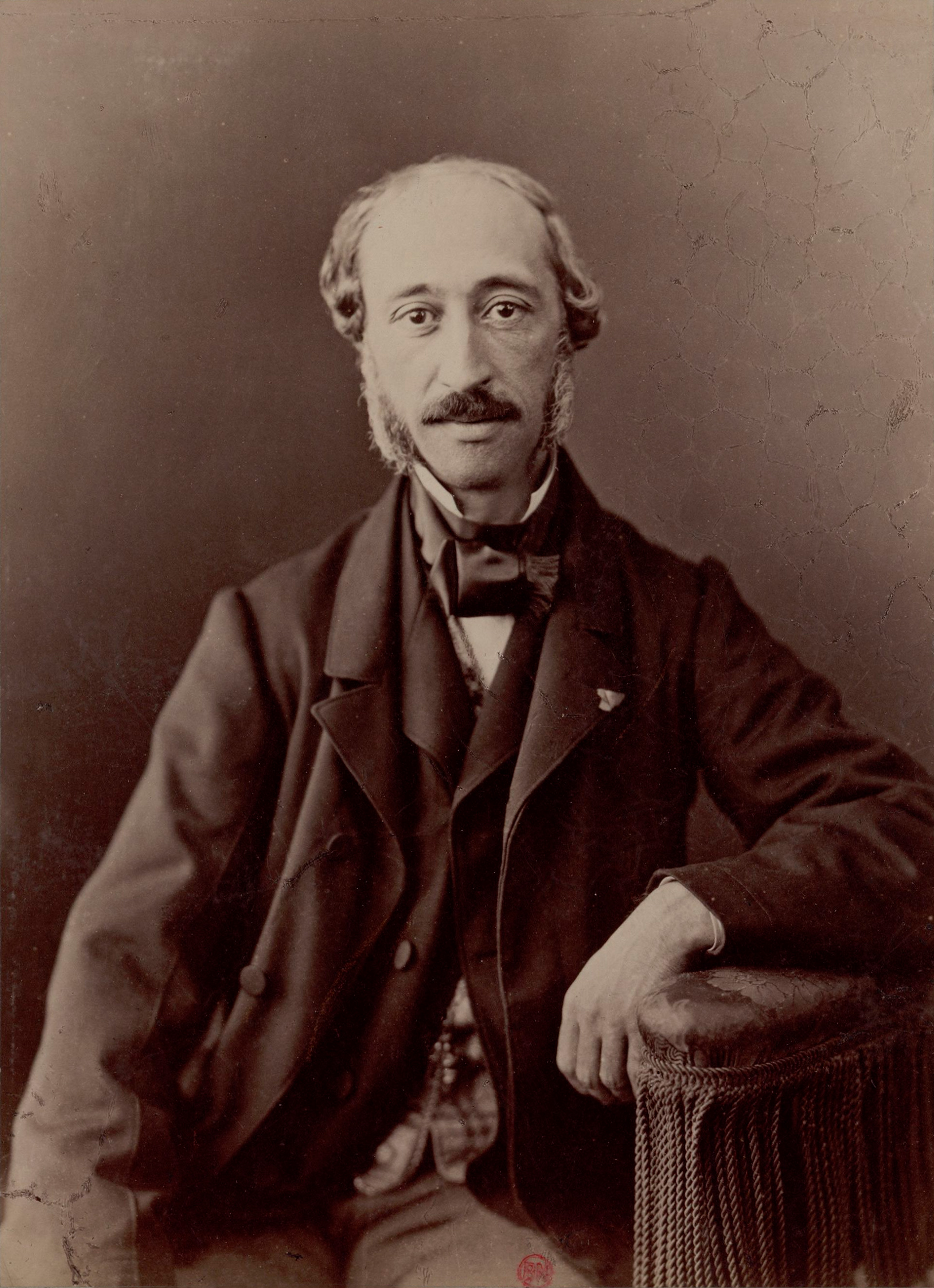
Edmond Becquerel

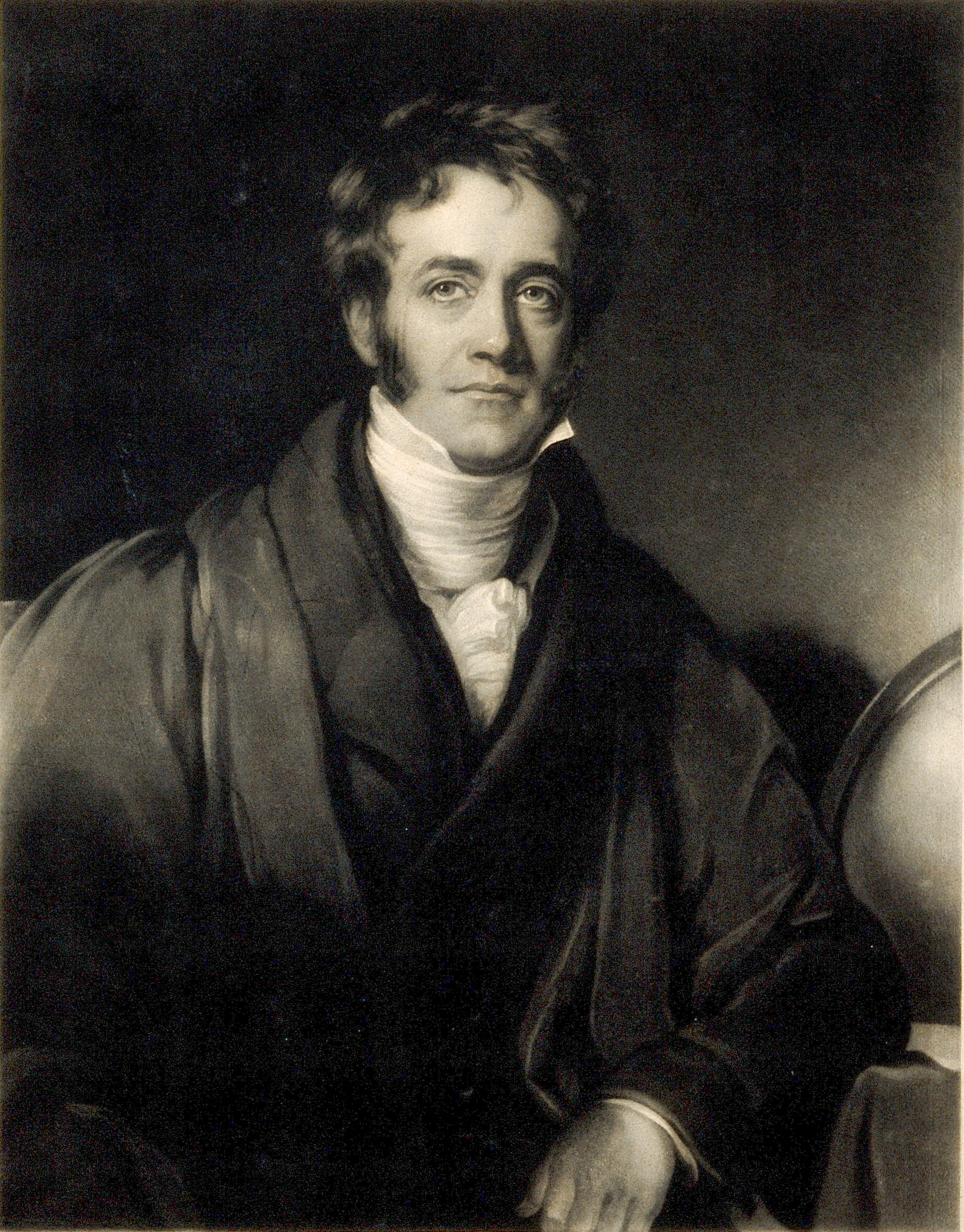
John Herschel

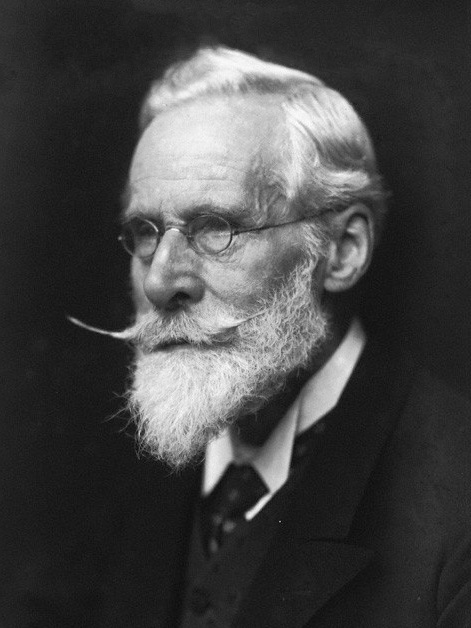
William Crookes

Researchers in luminescence, fluorescence and phosphorescence

Luminescence is the non-thermal emission of visible light by a substance; an example is the emission of visible light by minerals in response to irradiation by ultraviolet light. The term luminescence was first used by Eilhard Wiedemann in 1888; he stated that luminescence was separate from thermal radiation, and he distinguished six different forms of luminescence according to their excitation.

Fluorescence is luminescence which occurs during the irradiation of a substance by electromagnetic radiation; fluorescent materials stop emitting light nearly immediately after the irradiation is halted, except in the case of certain materials exhibiting delayed fluorescence (e.g., TADF, TTA). The term fluorescence was coined by George Stokes in 1852, and was derived from the behavior of fluorite when exposed to ultraviolet light.

Phosphorescence is long-lived luminescence; phosphorescent materials continue to emit light for some time after the radiation stops. In 1857 Edmond Becquerel invented the phosphoroscope, and in a detailed study of phosphorescence and fluorescence, showed that the duration of phosphorescence varies by substance, and that phosphorescence in solids is due to the presence of finely dispersed foreign substances. Becquerel suggested that fluorescence is simply phosphorescence of a very short duration. The most prominent phosphorescent material for 130 years was ZnS doped with Cu^{+}, or later Co^{2+}, ions. The material was discovered in 1866 by Théodore Sidot who succeeded in growing tiny ZnS crystals by a sublimation method.

Some additional kinds of luminescence from crystals can arise from energy sources other than electromagnetic radiation.

- Crystalloluminescence is the emission of light during crystal growth from solution, specifically during nucleation. The first observation was that of potassium sulfate which was reported by a number of researchers in the eighteenth century; other substances reported in the early literature which exhibit crystalloluminescence include strontium nitrate, cobalt sulfate, potassium hydrogen sulfate, sodium sulfate, and arsenious acid. In 1918 Harry Weiser summarised the research on crystalloluminescence up to that date. Neither the spectral distribution nor the excitation mechanisms of crystalloluminescence are understood.
- Triboluminescence is the generation of light when certain materials, for example quartz, are rubbed; fractoluminescence is the emission of light from the fracture of a crystal. The first recorded observation is attributed to Francis Bacon when he recorded in his 1620 Novum Organum that sugar sparkles when broken or scraped in the dark. The scientist Robert Boyle also reported on some of his work on triboluminescence in 1664.
- In 1677 Henry Oldenburg described the luminescence of fluorite, CaF_{2}, on heating; this is termed thermoluminescence.
- In 1830 Thomas Pearsall observed that colourless fluorite could be coloured by discharging sparks from a Leyden jar held against it. In 1881 luminescence excited by cathode rays was described by William Crookes, and in 1885 Edmond Becquerel found that when crystals were bombarded by cathode rays they became coloured and also emitted light; this has been termed cathodoluminescence. In 1894 Eugen Goldstein showed that ultraviolet light has the same effect as cathode rays.

=== Reflection from opaque materials ===
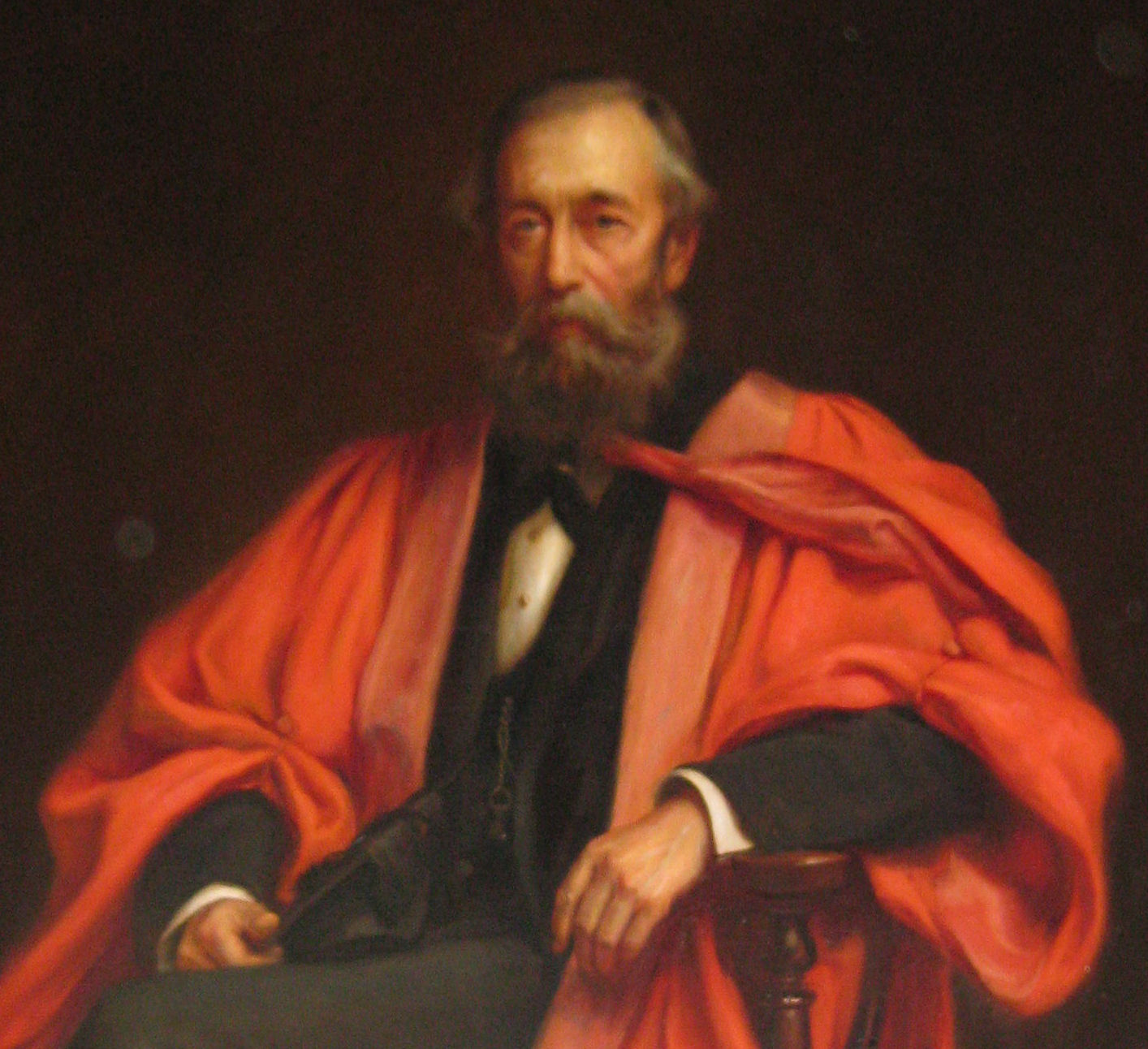
Henry Clifton Sorby

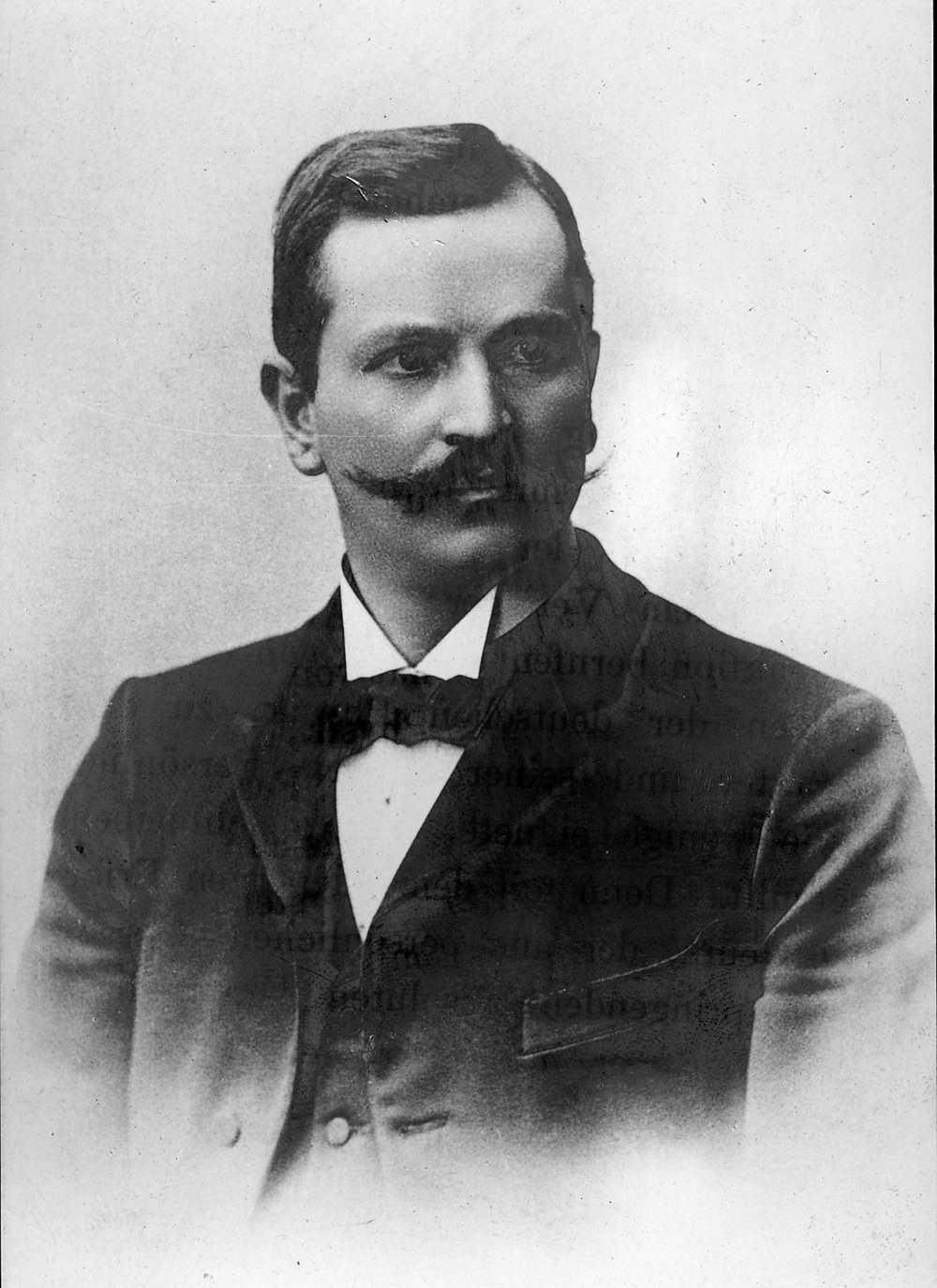
Paul Drude

Researchers in reflection from opaque materials

The study of the optical properties of opaque substances has been closely linked with the development of suitable microscopes. The first instrument adapted to reflected light was the Lieberkühn reflector attributed to Johann Nathanael Lieberkühn. The use of polished and etched surfaces for this type of study was introduced by Jöns Jacob Berzelius in 1813. A theory of the light reflected from metals was put forward by Augustin-Louis Cauchy in 1848. In 1858 Henry Clifton Sorby established the technique of cutting minerals and crystals into thin sections for examination under the polarizing microscope. In 1864 Sorby studied the microscopical structure of minerals from meteorites. In 1888 Paul Drude published work on reflection from antimony sulfide.

=== Infrared optics ===
Heinrich Rubens measured the dependence of the refractive index of quartz on wavelength, and found absorption in particular infrared wavelength ranges. By 1896 Rubens saw these bands as a potential filter that would allow him to separate out an almost monochromatic beam from the broad range of infrared radiation that his sources produced. In 1897 Rubens and his student Ernest Fox Nichols studied the reststrahlen (residual rays) obtained when infrared rays of appropriate wavelength are reflected from the surfaces of crystals.

== Effect of electricity and magnetism ==
=== Electrical conduction ===
The first observations on the variation of electrical conductivity with direction in a crystal (anisotropy) were made by Henri Hureau de Sénarmont in 1850 on 36 different substances. The results showed a correlation between the axes of symmetry and the directions of maximum or minimum conductivity. In 1855 Carlo Matteucci performed experiments on bismuth. In 1888, Helge Bäckström performed electrical conduction measurements on hematite, another crystal of rhombohedral symmetry.

Electrical conductivity in a crystal is now defined as a second rank symmetric tensor relating two vectors: $\mathbf{J}_i = \boldsymbol{\sigma}_{ij} \mathbf{E}_{j},$ where $\mathbf{J}_i$ is the current density, $\boldsymbol{\sigma}_{ij}$ is the electrical conductivity tensor, and $\mathbf{E}_{j}$ is the electric field intensity.

=== Magnetic properties ===
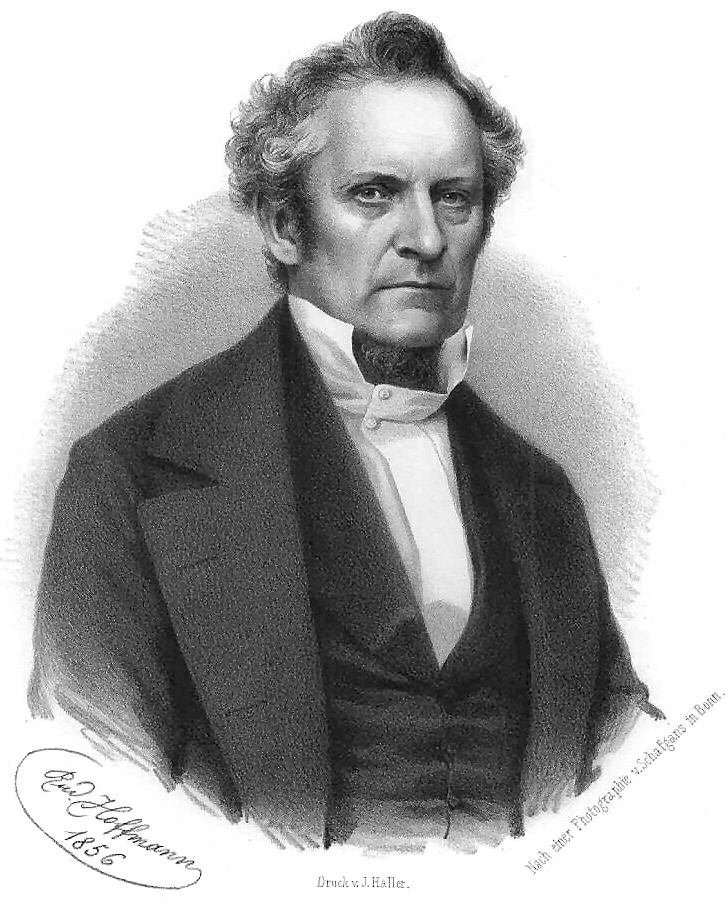
Julius Plücker

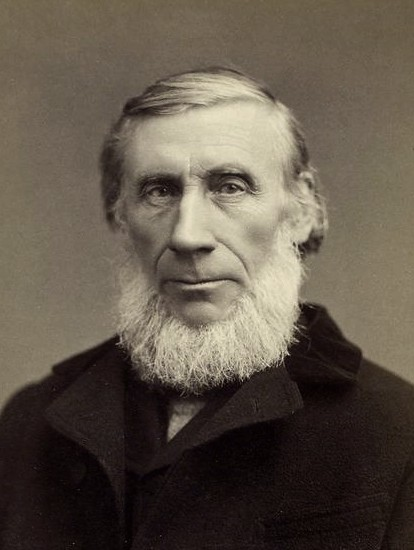
John Tyndall

Researchers in magnetic properties

Until the 19th century crystals were regarded either as magnetic or nonmagnetic. Magnetic crystals are now called ferromagnetic to distinguish them from the several other kinds which have since been discovered. Siméon Denis Poisson (1826) put forward a theory of magnetism as applied to crystals and predicted the behaviour of crystals in a magnetic field which was verified by Julius Plücker in 1847. Plücker studied various natural crystals, such as quartz and related the reaction of the crystal to a magnetic field to its symmetry. All these crystals were repelled from a strong field, unlike ferromagnetic crystals. They were therefore called diamagnetic. In 1850 a number of investigations were carried out by Plücker and August Beer using torsion balances to measure the small forces involved in most observations. Not only were some crystals repelled from a strong field but others were slightly attracted. These were called paramagnetic. Between 1850 and 1856 John Tyndall studied diamagnetism in crystals.

By the end of the 19th century the three types of crystal—ferromagnetic, diamagnetic and paramagnetic—were well established and successful theories had related diamagnetic and paramagnetic crystals to their crystal symmetry. Ferromagnetic properties were dealt with by Pierre Weiss (1896) who explained the hysteresis by assuming that the atoms have permanent magnetic poles which are normally in random positions, but arrange themselves in parallel under the influence of a magnetic field. On removing the field the mutual effect of the parallel dipoles tends to maintain the magnetized state. He further postulated that there were domains within which all the atomic dipoles were similarly orientated and that the N-S axis could be differently orientated in neighbouring domains.

=== Dielectric properties ===
A dielectric is an electrical insulator that can be polarised by an applied electric field. In 1851 the first experiments on the behaviour of crystals in an electric field were carried out by Hermann Knoblauch in a manner similar to that used for the study of magnetic properties. The conductivity of the crystals, both over the surface and through the body of the crystal, made these experiments unreliable. In 1876 Elihu Root avoided some of these difficulties by employing a rapidly alternating field between parallel plates. In 1893 Friedrich Pockels gave an account of the abnormally large piezoelectric constants of Rochelle salt. A brief history on the theories of dielectrics in the 19th century has been written.

== Effect of temperature change ==
=== Thermal expansion ===
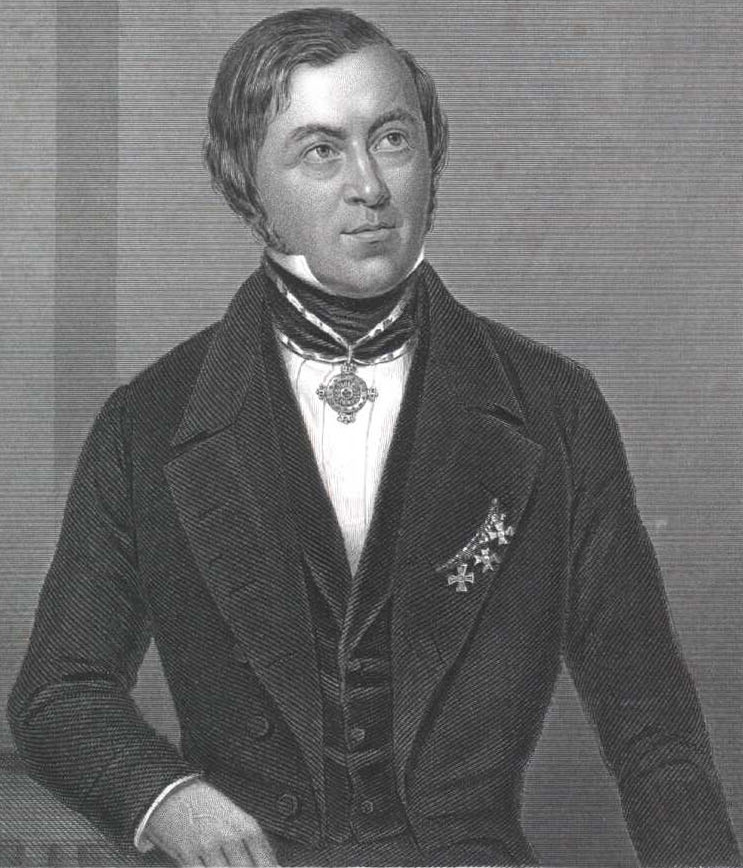
Eilhard Mitscherlich

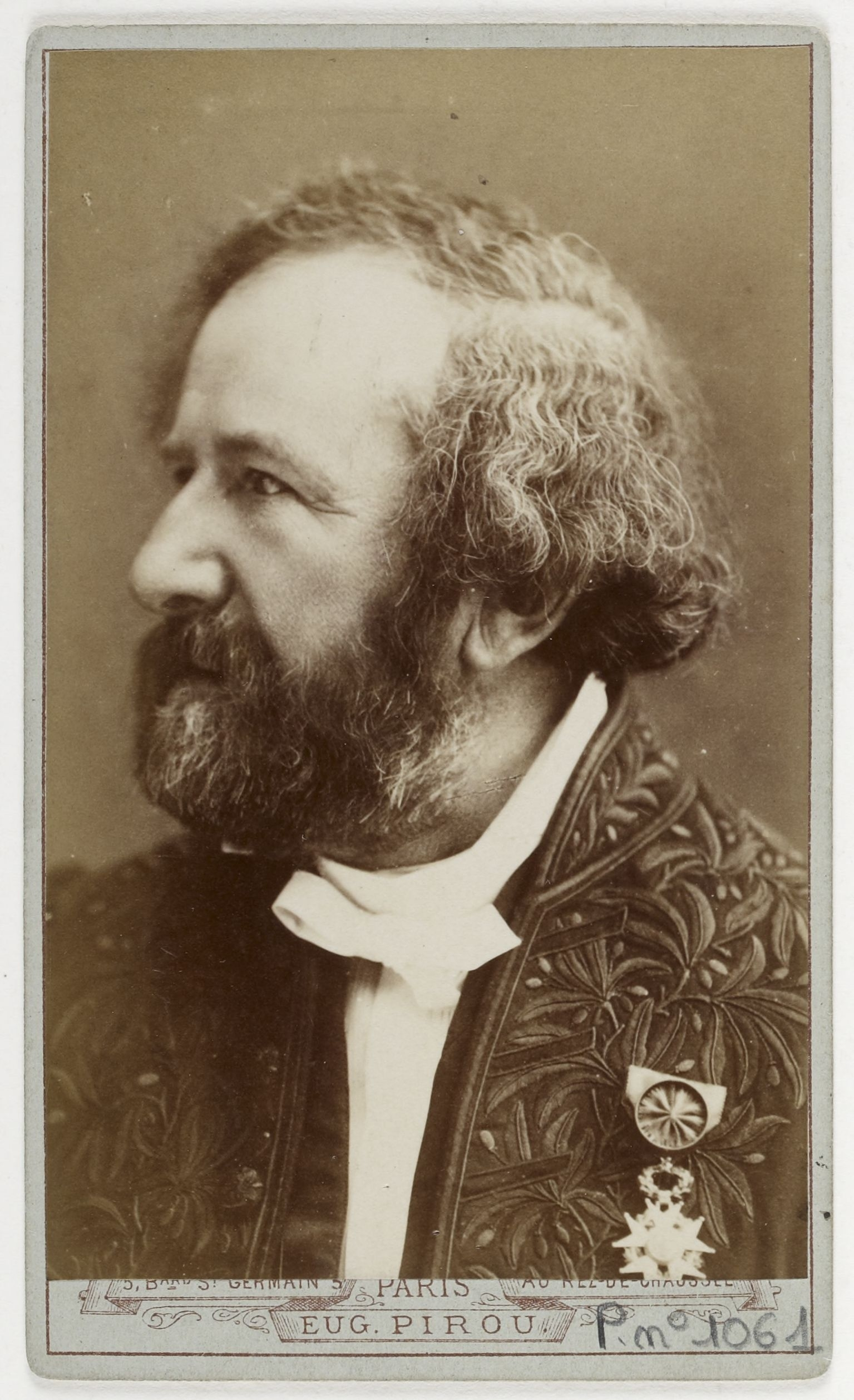
Hippolyte Fizeau

Researchers in thermal expansion

In 1824 Eilhard Mitscherlich observed that the angle between the cleavage faces of calcite changed with the temperature of the crystal. Mitscherlich concluded that, on heating, calcite contracts (has a negative coefficient of thermal expansion) in a direction perpendicular to the trigonal axis while expanding (positive coefficient) along that axis. This implies that there is a cone of directions along which there is no thermal expansion. In 1864 Hippolyte Fizeau used an optical interference method to make measurements on many crystals. The measurements of the change of interfacial angle and the expansion of cut plates and bars were applied to crystals of all symmetries.

Crystals with less than cubic symmetry are anisotropic and will generally have different expansion coefficients in different directions. If the crystal symmetry is monoclinic or triclinic, even the angles between the axes are subject to thermal changes. In these cases the coefficient of thermal expansion is a tensor. If the temperature T of a crystal is raised by an amount ΔT, a deformation takes place that is described by the strain tensor u_{ij} = α_{ij}ΔT. The quantities α_{ij} are the coefficients of thermal expansion. Since u_{ij} is a symmetrical polar tensor of second rank and T is a scalar, α_{ij} is a symmetric tensor of second rank. The contemporary usage of the term tensor was introduced by Woldemar Voigt in 1898.

=== Thermal conduction ===
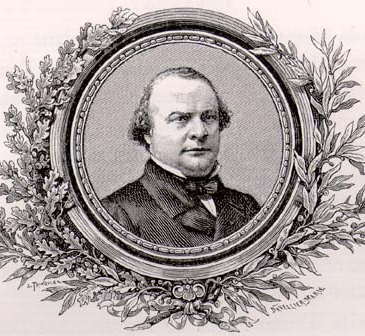
Henri Hureau de Sénarmont

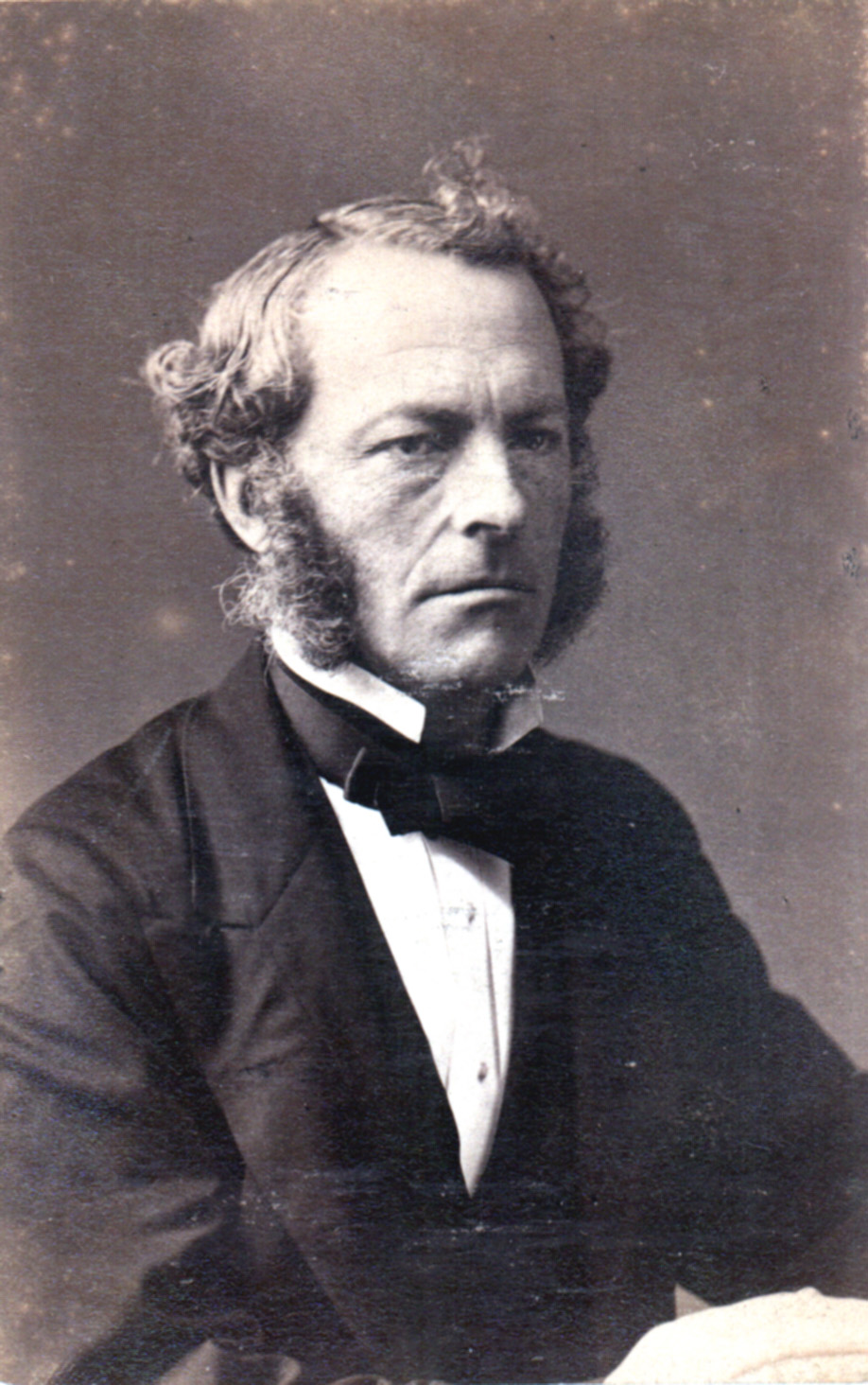
George Stokes

Researchers in thermal conduction

Joseph Fourier was an early researcher in thermal conduction, publishing Théorie analytique de la chaleur in 1822. The first experiments on thermal conduction in crystals were carried out by Jean-Marie Duhamel in 1832.

Henri Hureau de Sénarmont conducted experiments to determine if heat would move through crystals with directional dependence. He found that, for non-cubic crystals, the isothermal envelope surrounding a point source of heat in a crystal plate had an elliptical shape whose exact form depended on the orientation of the crystal. Sénarmont's results qualitatively established that thermal conductivity is directionally dependent (thermal anisotropy), with characteristic directions related to crystallographic axes. In 1848 Duhamel provided an analysis of Sénermont's findings.

George Gabriel Stokes and William Thomson provided mathematical theories to explain Sénarmont's observations. Stokes acknowledged the connection between the phenomena and the symmetry of the crystal, and showed that the number of constants of heat conductivity reduces from nine to six in the case of two planes of symmetry. The matrix of thermal conductivity components resulting from Stoke's derivation constituted a tensor. Experiments by Franz Stenger in 1884 examined the theories put forward by Stokes and Thomson and disproved some of their theoretical speculations.

=== Thermoelectricity ===
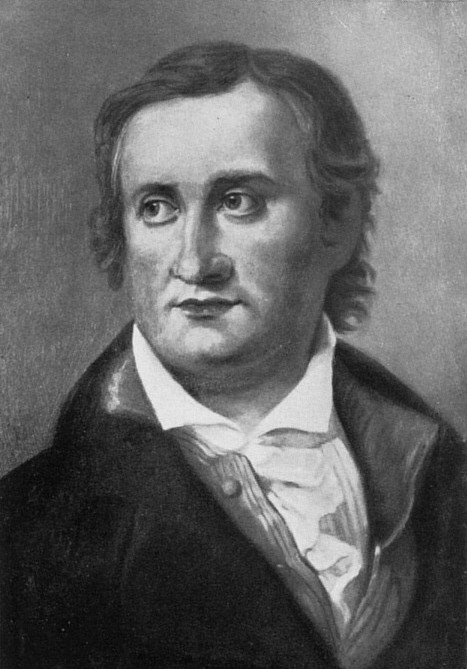
Thomas Johann Seebeck

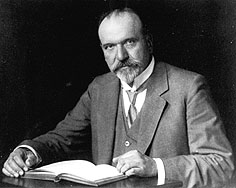
Theodor Liebisch

Researchers in thermoelectricity

Thomas Johann Seebeck discovered the thermoelectric effect in 1821, although it has been claimed that Alessandro Volta should be given the priority. In 1844 Wilhelm Gottlieb Hankel investigated thermoelectricity in cobalt and iron sulfide crystals. Hankel showed that when certain external faces were developed the crystals were thermoelectrically positive relative to copper, whereas with other facial forms they were negative. In 1850 Jöns Svanberg used bismuth and antimony crystals to demonstrate a directional variation of the thermoelectric effect. In 1854 William Thomson put forward a mechanical theory of thermoelectric currents in crystalline solids. In 1889 Theodor Liebisch analyzed the dependence of the thermoelectric force on the crystallographic direction in anisotropic crystals.

=== Pyroelectricity ===
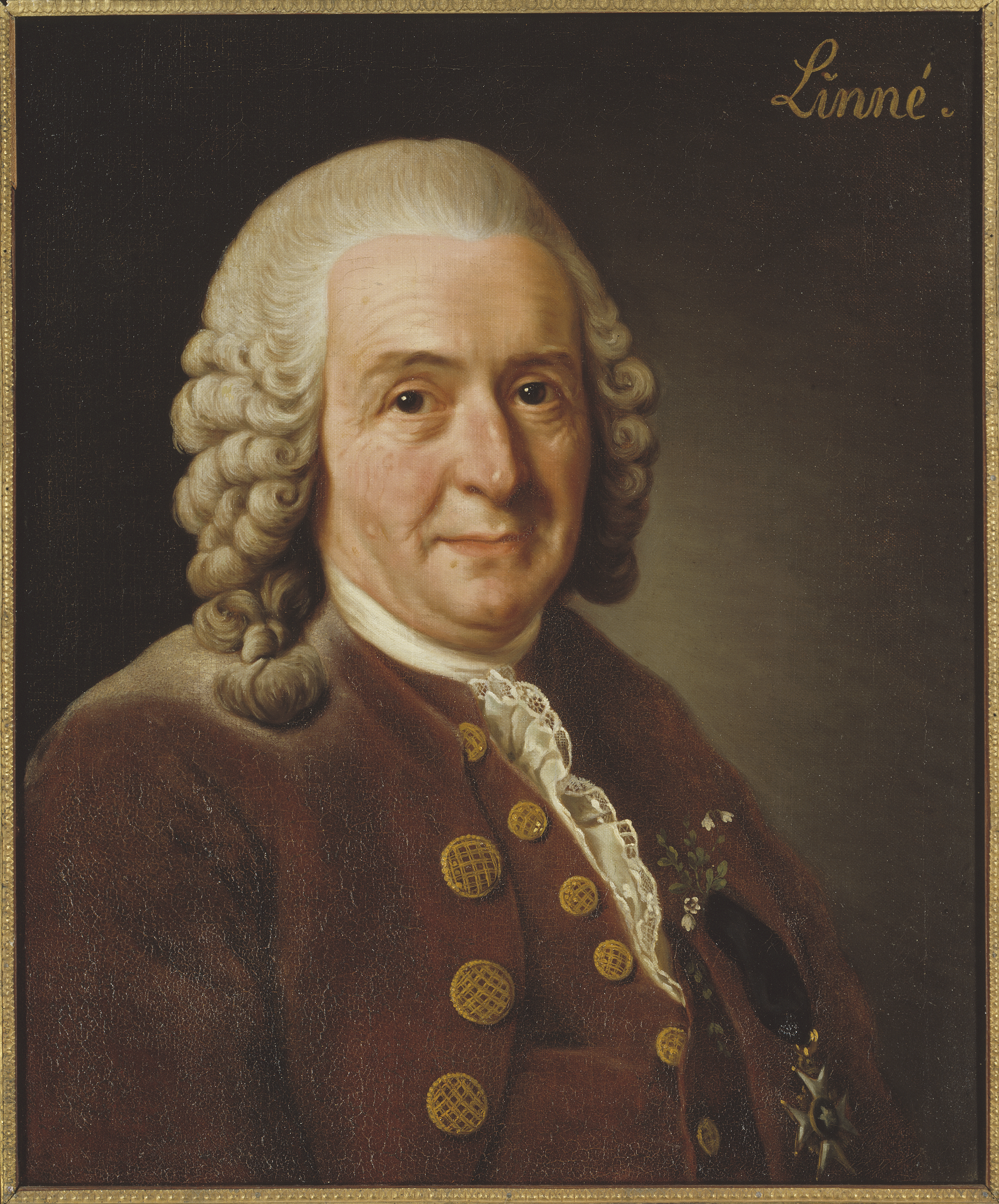
Carl Linnaeus

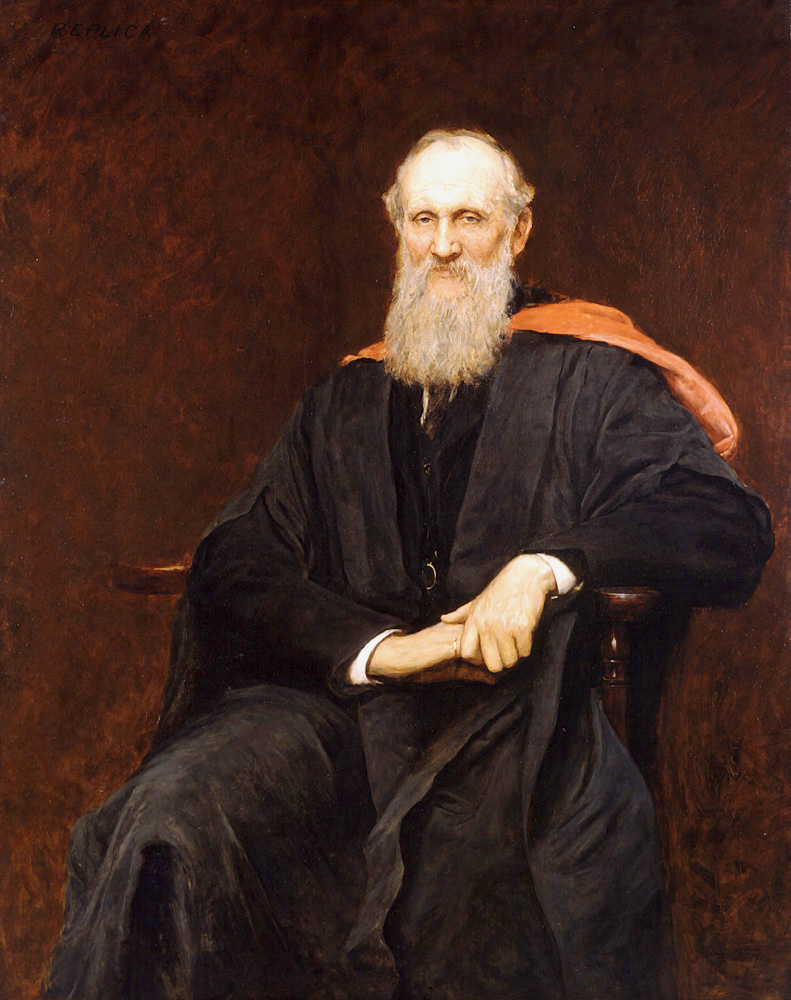
William Thomson

Researchers in pyroelectricity

Pyroelectricity is the generation of a temporary voltage in a crystal when subjected to a temperature change. The appearance of electrostatic charges upon a change of temperature has been observed since ancient times, in particular with tourmaline and was described, among others, by Steno, Linnaeus, Aepinus and René Just Haüy. Aepinus published an account of his observations in 1756. Haüy made detailed investigations of pyroelectricity; he detected pyroelectricity in calamine and showed that electricity in tourmaline was strongest at the poles of the crystal and became imperceptible at the middle. Haüy published a book on electricity and magnetism in 1787. Haüy later showed that hemihedral crystals are electrified by temperature change while holohedral (symmetric) crystals are not.

Research into pyroelectricity became more quantitative in the 19th century. In 1824 David Brewster gave the effect the name it has today. In 1840 Gabriel Delafosse, Haüy's student, theorized that only molecules which are not symmetrical can be polarized electrically. Both William Thomson in 1878 and Woldemar Voigt in 1897 helped develop a theory for the processes behind pyroelectricity.

A detailed history of pyroelectricity has been written by Sidney Lang; shorter histories have also been published.

== Effect of mechanical force ==
=== Elasticity ===
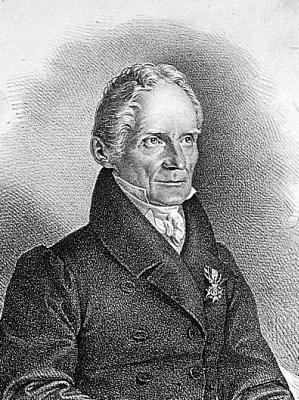
Friedrich Mohs

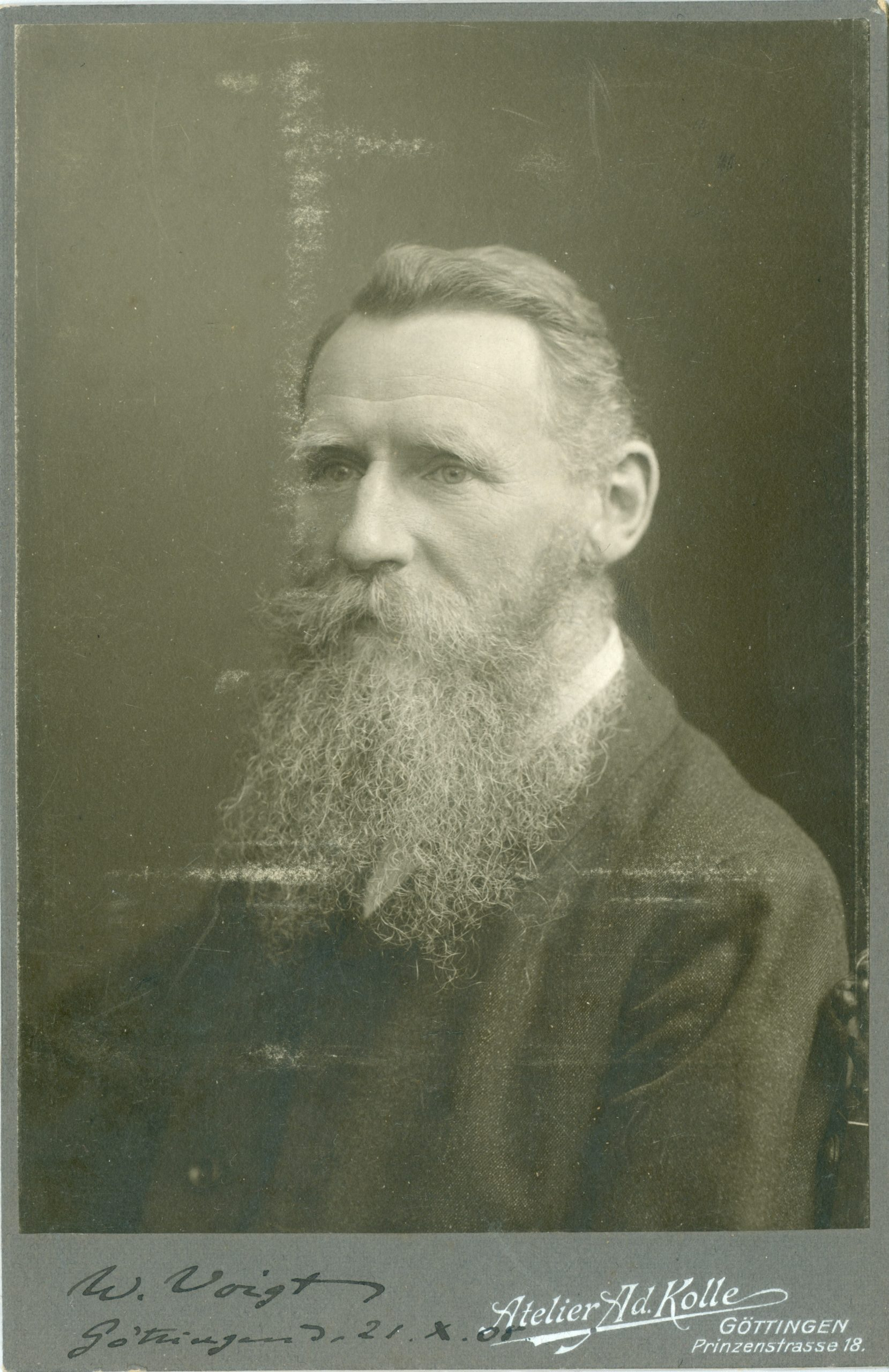
Woldemar Voigt

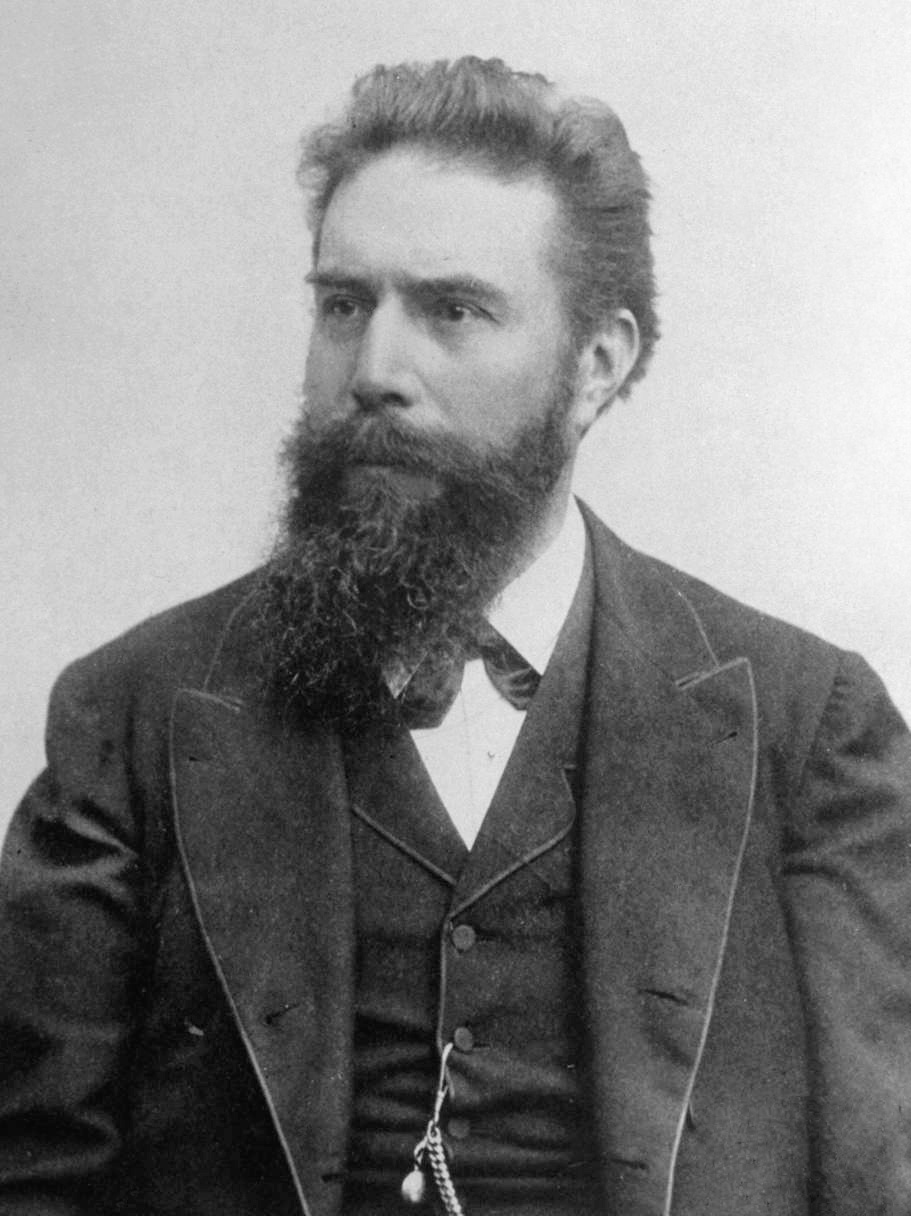
Wilhelm Röntgen

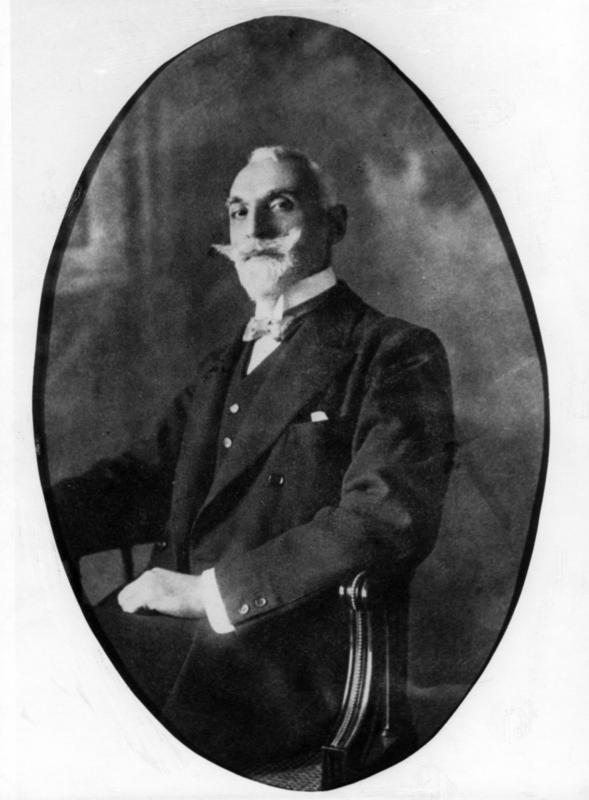
Lambros Koromilas

Researchers in elastic properties

Some minerals, for example mica, are highly elastic, springing back to their original shape after being bent. Others, for example talc, may be readily bent but do not return to their original form when released. The initial theory of the elasticity of solid bodies were developed in the 1820s. Augustin-Louis Cauchy and Siméon Denis Poisson published theories of the mutual action of a regular arrangement of particles for a non-cubic body in 1823 and 1829 respectively. In 1827 Claude-Louis Navier published a theory for an isotropic body. Also during the 1820s Friedrich Mohs introduced his eponymous scale of hardness. In 1834 Franz Ernst Neumann published a paper on the elasticity of homohedral crystals.

In 1828 Cauchy generalised the problem and showed that 36 independent constants were required to describe elasticity in crystals. George Green (1837) introduced the limitation that the force between any two elements of a crystal, however small, must lie along the line joining their centres. This reduced the number of constants from 36 to 21. William Thomson (1857) showed that Green's assumption was unnecessary and that the thermodynamic requirements of a reversible process require only 21 constants, without any special assumptions. In 1874 Woldemar Voigt measured the elasticity of rock salt and G. Baumgarten measured the elasticity of calcite. In 1887 Wilhelm Röntgen and J. Schneider measured the cubic compressibility of sodium and potassium chlorides. In 1877 Lambros Koromilas measured the elasticity of gypsum and mica by twisting mineral bars.; in 1881 H. Klang carried out similar experiments with fluorites.

In the period 1874–1888 Voigt was the leading researcher on the elasticity of crystals. Voigt showed that the number of elasticity constants reduces as more symmetry is introduced into the crystal. For a triclinic crystal, which is the most general case, 21 elasticity constants are required. For a monoclinic crystal there are 13 elasticity constants, for a rhombic crystal 9, for a hexagonal crystal 7, for a tetragonal crystal 6, and finally for a cubic crystal there are only 3. A summary of developments in the field was published by W. A. Wooster.

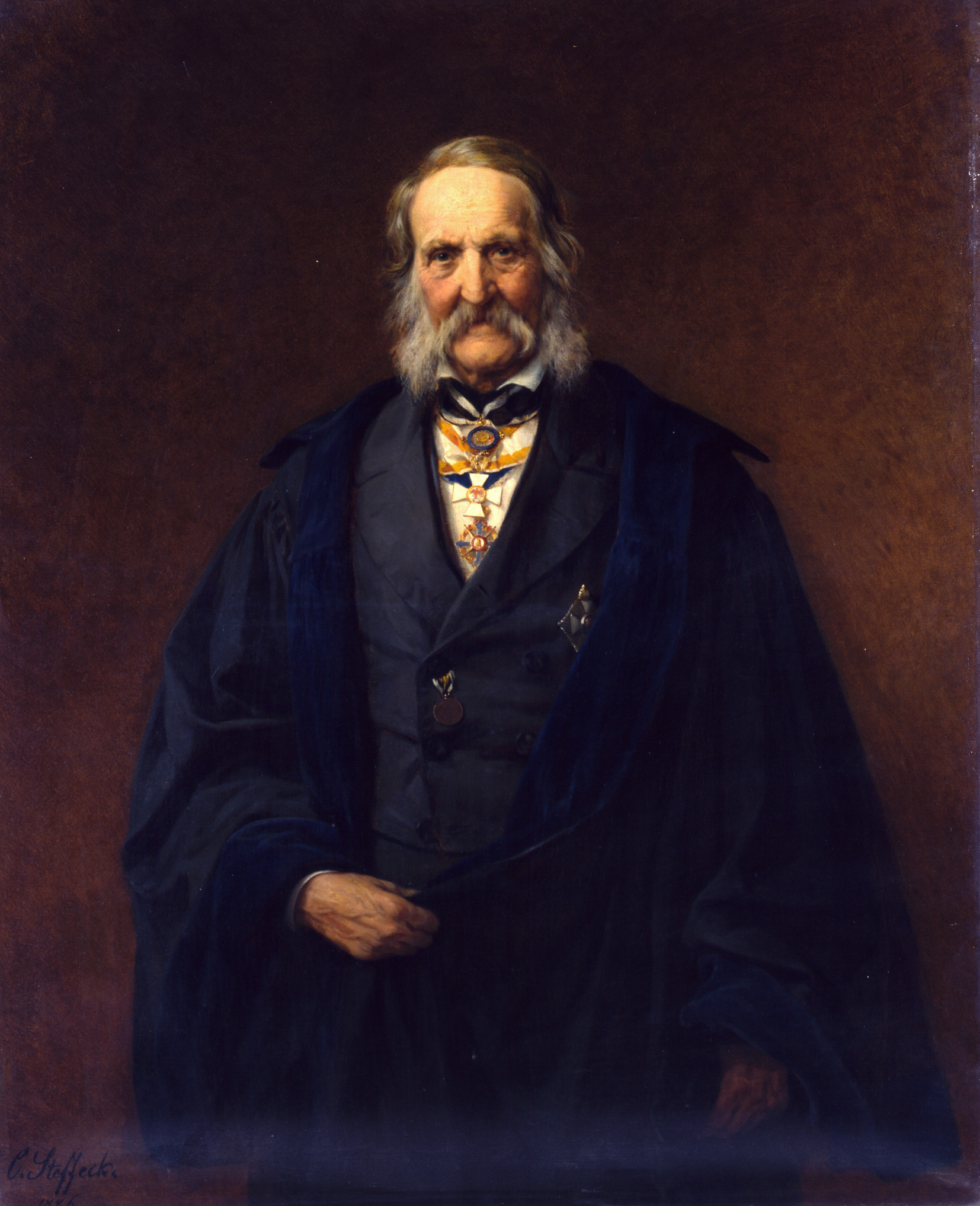
Franz Ernst Neumann

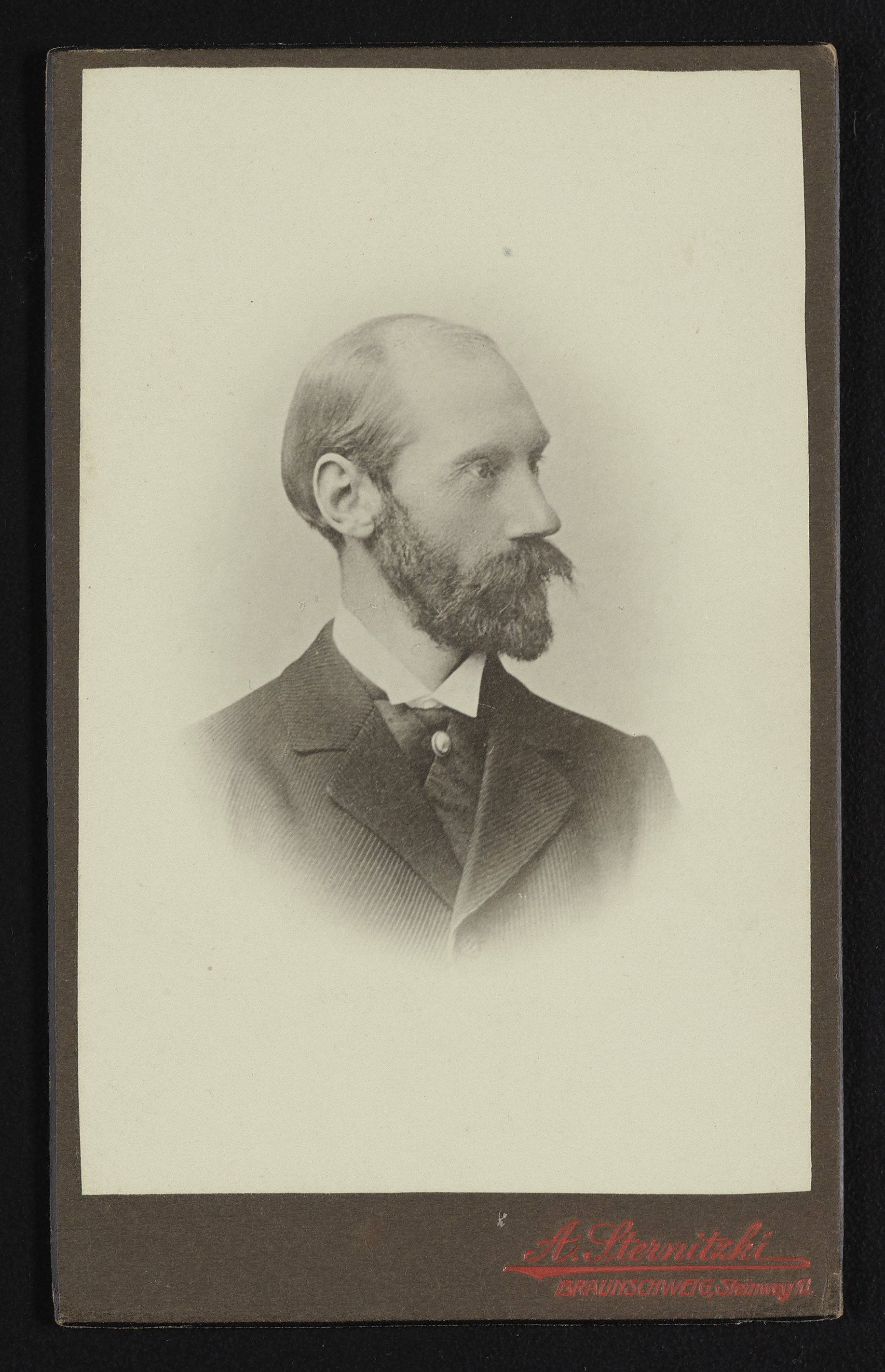
Friedrich Pockels

Researchers in photoelasticity

=== Photoelasticity ===
Photoelasticity describes changes in the optical properties of a material under mechanical deformation. The photoelastic phenomenon in transparent, non-crystalline materials (gels and glasses) was first discovered by David Brewster in 1815. Brewster then detected the effect in crystals and showed that uniaxial crystals could be made biaxial. In 1822 Augustin-Jean Fresnel experimentally confirmed that the photoelastic effect was a stress-induced birefringence.

Franz Ernst Neumann investigated double refraction in stressed transparent bodies. In 1841 Neumann published his elastic equations, which describe, in differential form, the changes which polarized light experiences when travelling through a stressed body. The Neumann equations are the basis of all subsequent photoelasticity research.

The photoelastic effect was analyzed by Friedrich Pockels, who also discovered the Pockels electro-optic effect (the production of birefringence of light on the application of an electric field). In 1889–1890 Pockels produced a phenomenological theory for both of these effects for all crystal classes.

=== Piezoelectricity ===
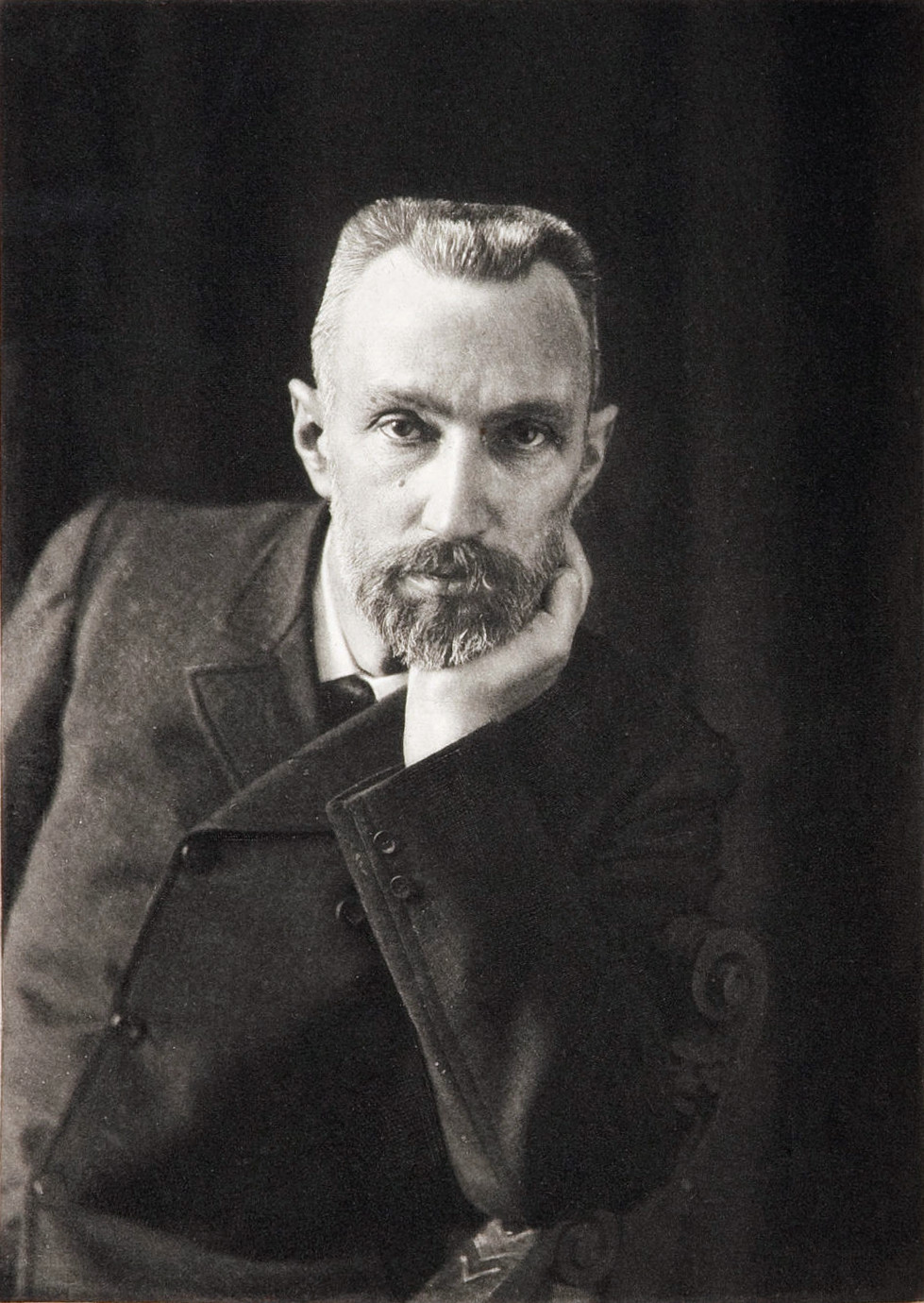
Pierre Curie

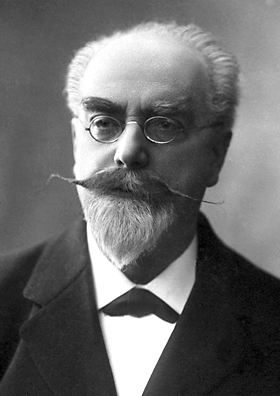
Gabriel Lippmann

Researchers in piezoelectricity

In 1880 Pierre and Jacques Curie discovered piezoelectricity (an electric charge that accumulates in response to applied mechanical stress) in certain crystals, including quartz, tourmaline, cane sugar and sodium chlorate. The Curies, however, did not predict the converse piezoelectric effect (the internal generation of a mechanical strain resulting from an applied electric field). The converse effect was deduced by Gabriel Lippmann in 1881. The Curies immediately confirmed the existence of the effect, and went on to obtain quantitative proof of the complete reversibility of electro-elasto-mechanical deformations in piezoelectric crystals.

In 1890 Woldemar Voigt published a phenomenological theory of the piezoelectric effect based on the symmetry of crystals without centrosymmetry.

== Research community ==
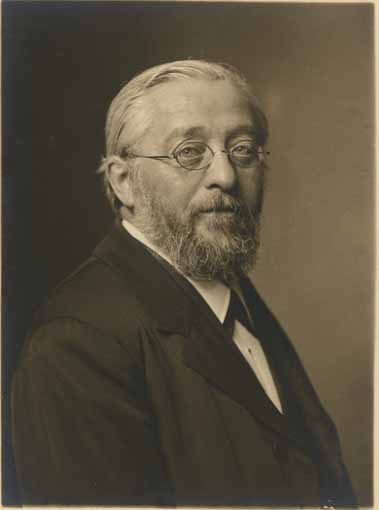
Paul Groth

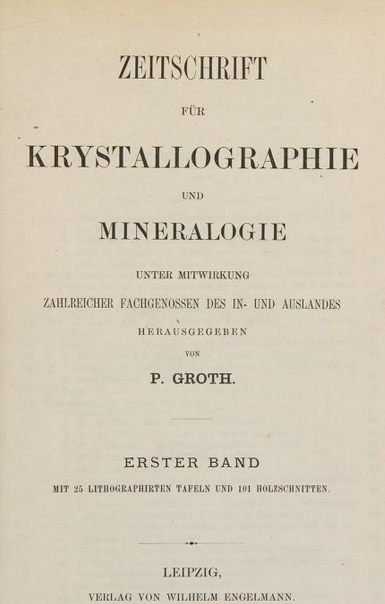
Z. Krist., 1, 1877

Founder of Zeitschrift für Krystallographie
(later spelled Kristallographie)

Before the 20th century crystallography was not a well-established academic discipline. There were no academic positions specifically in crystallography. Workers in the field normally carried out their crystallographic research as an ancillary to other employment(s), or had independent means. The leading workers in the field of physical crystallography were employed as follows:

- Professors
  - Mathematics or science: Airy, Arago, E. Becquerel, Biot, Curie, Drude, Hamilton, Linnaeus, Mitscherlich, Pasteur, Pockels, Plücker, Stokes, Tyndall, Thomson, Voigt
  - Mineralogy: Groth, Haüy, Liebisch, Mohs, Neumann, Sénarmont
- Other employment: Bartholinus (physician), Brewster (editor), Fresnel (engineer), Hooke (municipal official), Malus (military officer)
- Independently wealthy: Herschel, Huygens

In the nineteenth century there were informal schools of physical crystallography researchers in France (Arago, E. Becquerel, Biot, Fresnel, Haüy, Sénarmont), Germany (Drude, Groth, Liebisch, Mitscherlich, Mohs, Neumann, Pockels, Voigt) and the British Isles (Airy, Brewster, Hamilton, Stokes, Thomson).

Until the founding of Zeitschrift für Krystallographie und Mineralogie by Paul Groth in 1877 there was no lead journal for the publication of crystallographic papers. The majority of crystallographic research was published in the journals of national scientific societies, or in mineralogical journals. The inauguration of Groth's journal marked the emergence of crystallography as a mature science independent of geology.

== See also ==
- History of crystallography before X-rays
  - Chemical crystallography before X-rays
  - Geometrical crystallography before X-rays
- Timeline of crystallography

== Works cited ==
- Aepinus (1756). "Memoire concernant quelques nouvelles experiences électriques remarquables" [Memoir of some remarkable new electrical experiments]. Histoire de l'Académie royale des sciences et des belles lettres (Berlin) (in French). 12: 105–121.
- Airy, G. B. (1831). "On the nature of the light in the two rays produced by the double refaction of quartz". Transactions of the Cambridge Philosophical Society. 4: 79–123, 198–208.
- Ampère, A. M. (1828). "Mémoire sur la détermination de la surface courbe des ondes lumineuses dans un milieu don't l'élasticité est différente suivant les trois directions principales" [Memoir on the determination of the curved surface of light waves in a medium where elasticity is different in the three main directions]. Annales de chimie et de physique (in French). 39: 113–45.
- Anatychuk, Lukyan I. (2024). "On the Discoverers of Thermoelectricity". In Anatychuk, Lukyan I.; Burkov, Alexander; Goldsmid, Hiroshi Julian; Grin, Yuri; Koumoto, Kunihito; Narducci, Dario; Nolas, George S. (eds.). 200 Years of Thermoelectricity: An Historical Journey Through the Science and Technology of Thermoelectric Materials (1821-2021). Springer Series in Materials Science. Vol. 328. Cham: Springer International Publishing. pp. 3–12. doi:10.1007/978-3-031-22108-8_1. ISBN 978-3-031-22107-1.
- Arago, François (1811). "Mémoire sur une modification remarquable qu'éprouvent les rayons lumineux dans leur passage à travers certains corps diaphanes et sur quelques autres nouveaux phénomènes d'optique" [Memoir on a remarkable modification that light rays experience during their passage through certain translucent substances and on some other new optical phenomena]. Mémoires de la classe des sciences mathématiques et physiques de l'Institut Impérial de France, première partie (in French): 93–134.
- Authier, A. (2013). Early days of x-ray crystallography. International Union of Crystallography Texts on Crystallography. Oxford: Oxford University Press. doi:10.1093/acprof:oso/9780199659845.001.0001. ISBN 9780198754053.
- Authier, A., ed. (2014). International Tables for Crystallography: Physical properties of crystals. Vol. D. p. 11. doi:10.1107/97809553602060000113. ISBN 978-1-118-76229-5.
- Babinet, J. (1838). "Sur l'absorption dans les milieux colorés biréfringents" [On absorption in bi-refractive coloured media]. Comptes rendus hebdomadaires des séances de l'Académie des sciences (in French). 7: 832–833.
- Bacon, Francis (1620). Novum Organum (in Latin). "Atque certissimum est saccharum omne, sive conditum (ut vocant) sive simplex, modo sit durius, in tenebris fractum aut cultello scalptum coruscare [And it is most certain that all sugar, whether seasoned (as they call it) or plain, provided it is harder, will sparkle in the dark when broken or scratched with a knife.]"
- Bäckström, Helge (1888). "Beiträge zur Kenntniss der Thermoelektricität der Krystalle" [Contributions to understanding the thermoelectric properties of crystals]. Öfversigt af Kongl. Vetenskaps-akademiens forhandlingar (in German). 45 (8): 553–559. Archived from the original on 24 August 2010.
- Bartholin, Erasmus (1669). Experimenta crystalli islandici disdiaclastici quibus mira & infolita refractio detegitur [Experiments on birefringent Icelandic crystal through which is detected a remarkable and unique refraction] (in Latin). Copenhagen: Daniel Paulli.
- Baumgarten, G. (January 1874). "Die Elasticität von Kalkspathstäbchen" [The elasticity of calcite bars]. Annalen der Physik (in German). 228 [152] (7): 369–397. Bibcode:1874AnP...228..369B. doi:10.1002/andp.18742280702.
- Becquerel, Edmond (1859). Recherches sur divers effets lumineux qui resultent de l'action de la lumière sur les corps (1st, 2nd and 3rd Mémoires) [Research on various light effects resulting from the action of light on bodies] (in French). Paris: Mallet-Bachelier.
- Becquerel, Edmond (1885). "Étude spectrale des corps rendus phosphorescents par l'action de la lumière ou par les d´echarges électriques" [Spectral study of bodies made phosphorescent by the action of light or by electrical charges]. Comptes rendus hebdomadaires des séances de l'Académie des sciences (in French). 101: 205–210. Archived from the original on 20 April 2024.
- Becquerel, Henri (1888a). "Recherches sur les variations des spectres d'absorption dans les cristaux" [Research on variations in absorption spectra in crystals]. Annales de chimie et de physique (in French). 14: 170–257.
- Becquerel, Henri (1888b). "Sur les variations des spectres d'absorption des composés du didyme" [Variations in the absorption spectra of didymium compounds]. Annales de chimie et de physique (in French). 14: 257–279.
- Berry, M. V.; Jeffrey, M. R. (2007). "Conical diffraction: Hamilton's diabolical point at the heart of crystal optics". In Wolf, E. (ed.). Progress in Optics. Vol. 50. Elsevier. pp. 13–50. Bibcode:2007PrOpt..50...13B. doi:10.1016/S0079-6638(07)50002-8. ISBN 978-0-444-53023-3.
- Biot, Jean-Baptiste (1812a). "Mémoire sur un nouveau genre d'oscillation que les molécules de la lumière éprouvent en traversant certains cristaux" [Memoir on a new kind of oscillation that light molecules experience when passing through certain crystals]. Mémoires de la Classe des Sciences Mathématiques et Physiques de l'Instut Impérial de France (in French). 13 (1): 1–371.
- Biot, Jean-Baptiste (1812b). "Sur la découverte d'une propriété nouvelle dont jouissent les forces polarisent des certains cristaux" [On the discovery of a new property demonstrated by the polarizing forces of certain crystals]. Mémoires de la Classe des Sciences Mathématiques et Physiques de l'Instut Impérial de France (in French). 13 (2): 19–30.
- Blunt, Wilfrid (1971). The compleat naturalist; a life of Linnaeus (1st ed.). New York: Viking Press. ISBN 067023396X.
- Boulliard, Jean-Claude; Cabaret, Delphine; Giura, Paolo (2022). "René-Just Haüy and the birth of crystallography". IUCr Newsletter. 30 (4). IUCr.
- Boyle, Robert (1664). "Experiments and considerations touching colours first occasionally written, among some other essays to a friend, and now suffer'd to come abroad as the beginning of an experimental history of colours". Library Digital Collections: Early English Books Online. University of Michigan. pp. 391–411.
- Brandmüller, J. (1986). "An extension of the Neumann–Minnigerode–Curie principle". Computers & Mathematics with Applications. 12 (1–2). Elsevier BV: 97–100. doi:10.1016/0898-1221(86)90143-4.
- Brewster, David (1815). "On the effects of simple pressure in producing that species of crystallization which forms two oppositely polarised images, and exhibits the complementary colours by polarised light". Philosophical Transactions of the Royal Society of London. 105 (Part 1): 60–64. doi:10.1098/rstl.1815.0006.
- Brewster, David (31 December 1816). "On the communication of the structure of doubly refracting crystals to glass, muriate of soda, fluor spar, and other substances, by mechanical compression and dilatation". Philosophical Transactions of the Royal Society of London. 106 (Part 1): 156–178. doi:10.1098/rstl.1816.0011. S2CID 108782967.
- Brewster, David (1818). "On the Effects of Compression and Dilatation in altering the Polarising Structure of Doubly Refracting Crystals". Transactions of the Royal Society of Edinburgh. 8 (2): 283–286. doi:10.1017/s0080456800018214.
- Brewster, David (31 December 1819a). "On the laws which regulate the absorption of polarised light by doubly refracting crystals". Philosophical Transactions of the Royal Society of London. 109 (Part 1): 11–28. doi:10.1098/rstl.1819.0004.
- Brewster, David (31 December 1819b). "On the action of crystallized surfaces upon light". Philosophical Transactions of the Royal Society of London. 109 (Part 1): 145–160. doi:10.1098/rstl.1819.0013.
- Brewster, David (1819c). "On the connection between the primitive forms of crystals and the number of their axes of double refraction". Memoirs of the Wernerian Natural History Society. 3: 50–74. Archived from the original on 3 September 2014.
- Brewster, David (1820a). "On the absorption of polarised light by doubly refracting crystals". Edinburgh Philosophical Journal. 2: 341–348.
- Brewster, David (1820b). "On the phenomena of dichroism". Edinburgh Philosophical Journal. 3: 244–247.
- Brewster, David (1824). "Observations of the pyro-electricity of minerals". The Edinburgh Journal of Science. 1: 208–215.
- Buchwald, Jed Z. (1989). The rise of the wave theory of light: optical theory and experiment in the early 19th century. Chicago: Chicago University Press. ISBN 0-226-07884-1.
- Burke, John G. (1966). Origins of the science of crystals. Berkeley, CA: University of California Press.
- Cauchy, Augustin-Louis (1823). "Recherches sur l'équilibrie et le mouvement intérieur des corps solides, ou fluides élastiques ou non élastiques" [Research on the equilibrium and internal movement of solid bodies, elastic or non-elastic fluids]. Bulletin des Sciences par la Société Philomathique de Paris (in French): 9–13. doi:10.1017/CBO9780511702518.038.
- Cauchy, Augustin-Louis (2009) [1828]. "Sur l'équilibre et le mouvement d'un système de points matériels sollicités par des forces d'attraction ou de repulsion materielle". Oeuvres Complètes: Series 2 [On the balance and movement of a system of material points as a result of forces of attraction or repulsion] (in French). Cambridge University Press. pp. 227–252. doi:10.1017/CBO9780511702679.011.
- Cauchy, A. (1848). "Note sur la lumière réfléchie par la surface d'un corps opaque, et spécialement d'un métal" [Note about the light reflected by the surface of an opaque body, and especially of a metal]. Comptes rendus hebdomadaires des séances de l'Académie des sciences (in French). 26: 86–88.
- Clifton, R. B. (1860). "On the conical refraction of a straight line". Quarterly Journal of Pure and Applied Mathematics. 3: 360–363.
- Cordier, L. (February 1809). "Description du dichröıte, nouvelle espèces minérale" [Description of dichröite, a new mineral species]. Journal des mines (in French). 25 (146): 129–138.
- Coromilas, L. A. (1877). "Ueber die Elasticitätsverhältnisse im Gyps und Glimmer [thesis]" [On the elasticities of gypsum and mica]. Zeitschrift für Krystallographie und Mineralogie (in German). 1: 407–412.
- Crookes, William (31 December 1881). "On discontinuous phosphorescent spectra in high vacua". Proceedings of the Royal Society of London. 32 (212–215): 206–213. doi:10.1098/rspl.1881.0022.
- Curie, Marie (1923). Pierre Curie. Translated by Kellogg, Charlotte and Vernon. New York: The Macmillan Company.
- Curie, Pierre (1894). "Sur la symétrie dans les phénomènes physiques, symétrie d'un champ électrique et d'un champ magnétique" [On symmetry in physical phenomena, symmetry of an electric field and a magnetic field]. Journal de Physique. 3e série (in French). 3: 393–415.
- Curie, Pierre (1982) [1894]. "On symmetry in physical phenomena, symmetry of an electric field and of a magnetic field". In Rosen, Joe (ed.). Symmetry in physics: selected reprints. Translated by Rosen, Joe; Copié, P. Stony Brook, NY: American Association of Physics Teachers. pp. 17–25.
- Curie, Pierre; Curie, Jacques (1880a). "Développement, par pression, de l'électricité polaire dans les cristaux hémièdres à faces inclinées" [Development of polar electricity by pressure in hemihedral crystals with inclined faces]. Comptes rendus de l'Académie des Sciences (in French). 91: 294–297.
- Curie, Pierre; Curie, Jacques (1880b). "Sur l'électricité polaire dans les cristaux hémièdres à faces inclinées" [On polar electricity in hemihedral crystals with inclined faces]. Comptes rendus de l'Académie des Sciences (in French). 91: 383–387.
- Curie, Pierre; Curie, Jacques (1881a). "Lois du dégagement de l'électricité par pression dans la tourmaline" [Laws of the release of electricity by pressure in tourmaline]. Comptes rendus de l'Académie des Sciences (in French). 92: 186–188.
- Curie, Pierre; Curie, Jacques (1881b). "Sur les phénomènes électriques de la tourmaline et des cristaux hémièdres à faces inclinées" [On the electrical phenomena of tourmaline and hemihedral crystals with inclined faces]. Comptes rendus de l'Académie des Sciences (in French). 92: 350–353.
- Curie, Pierre; Curie, Jacques (1881c). "Les cristaux hémièdres à faces inclinées, comme sources constantes d'électricité" [Hemihedral crystals with inclined faces, as constant sources of electricity]. Comptes rendus de l'Académie des Sciences (in French). 93: 204–207.
- Curie, Pierre; Curie, Jacques (1881d). "Contractions et dilatations produites par des tensions électriques dans les cristaux hémièdres à faces inclinées" [Contractions and expansions produced by electrical voltages in hemihedral crystals with inclined faces]. Comptes rendus de l'Académie des Sciences (in French). 93: 1137–1140. Archived from the original on 4 October 2011.
- Curie, Pierre; Curie, Jacques (1882). "Déformations électriques du quartz" [Electrical deformation of quartz]. Comptes rendus de l'Académie des Sciences (in French). 95: 914–916.
- Curie, Pierre; Curie, Jacques (1887). "Sur les phénomènes piézo-électriques" [On piezoelectric phenomena]. Bulletin des séances de la Société française de Physique (in French): 47–48.
- Curie, Pierre; Curie, Jacques (1889). "Dilatation électrique du quartz" [Electrical expansion of quartz]. Journal de Physique. 2e série (in French). 8: 149–169.
- Darmstaedter, Ludwig (1908). Ludwig Darmstaedters Handbuch zur Geschichte der Naturwissenschaften und der Technik [Ludwig Darmstaeder’s Handbook on the History of Science and Technology] (in German). Berlin: J. Springer. p. 558.
- Deas, Herbert D. (June 1959). "Crystallography and crystallographers in England in the early nineteenth century: a preliminary survey". Centaurus. 6 (2): 129–148. Bibcode:1959Cent....6..129D. doi:10.1111/j.1600-0498.1959.tb00253.x.
- Debré, Patrice (1998). "Crystals: A New Law". Louis Pasteur. Translated by Forster, Elborg. Baltimore: The Johns Hopkins University Press. pp. 29–51. ISBN 9780801865299.
- Des Cloizeaux, A. (1857a). "Note sur l'existence de la polarisation circulaire dans le cinabre" [Note on the existence of circular polarization in cinnabar]. Comptes rendus hebdomadaires des séances de l'Académie des sciences (in French). 44: 876–878.
- Des Cloizeaux, A. (1857b). "Complément à la note sur l'existence de la polarisation circulaire dans le cinabre, et observations sur le pouvoir rotatoire des cristaux de sulfate de strychnine" [Addition to the note on the existence of circular polarization in cinnabar, and observations on the rotational power of strychnine sulphate crystals]. Comptes rendus hebdomadaires des séances de l'Académie des sciences (in French). 44: 909–915.
- Des Cloizeaux, A. (1857c). "Sur la découverte de la polarisation circulaire dans les cristaux de cinabre; et sur l'existence simultanée du pouvoir rotatoire dans les cristaux et dans les dissolutions de sulfate de strychnine" [On the discovery of circular polarization in cinnabar crystals; and on the simultaneous existence of rotational power in crystals and in strychnine sulphate dissolutions]. Annales de chimie et de physique (in French). 51: 361–367.
- Drude, P. (January 1888). "Beobachtungen über die Reflexion des Lichtes am Antimonglanz" [Observations about the reflection of light on antimony]. Annalen der Physik (in German). 270 [34] (7): 489–531. Bibcode:1888AnP...270..489D. doi:10.1002/andp.18882700706.
- Drude, P. (January 1890). "Das Verhalten der Absorptionscoëfficienten von Krystallen" [The behaviour of the absorption coefficients of crystals]. Annalen der Physik (in German). 276 [40] (8): 665–680. Bibcode:1890AnP...276..665D. doi:10.1002/andp.18902760809.
- Drude, P. (January 1893). "Ueber die Berechnung magnetooptischer Erscheinungen" [On the calculation of magneto-optical phenomena]. Annalen der Physik (in German). 284 [48] (1): 122–125. Bibcode:1893AnP...284..122D. doi:10.1002/andp.18922840111.
- Drude, Paul (1900). Lehrbuch der Optik [Textbook of optics] (in German). Leipzig: S. Hirzel.
- Duhamel, J. M. C. (1832). "Sur les Équations générales de la propagation de la chaleur dans les Corps solides dont la conductibilité n'est pas la même dans tous les sens" [On the general equations of heat propagation in solid bodies whose conductivity is not the same in all directions]. Journal de l'École polytechnique (in French). 13: 356–399.
- Duhamel, J. M. C. (1848). "Propagation de la chaleur dans les cristaux" [Propagation of heat in crystals]. Journal de l'École polytechnique (in French). 19: 155–188.
- Faraday, Michael (1846a). "On new magnetic actions and on the magnetic condition of all matter". Philosophical Transactions of the Royal Society: Experimental Researches in Electricity. 20th series: 21–40. doi:10.5479/sil.389648.mq591304. Archived from the original on 31 July 2011.
- Faraday, Michael (1846b). "On new magnetic actions and on the magnetic condition of all matter — continued". Philosophical Transactions of the Royal Society: Experimental Researches in Electricity. 21st series: 41–62. doi:10.5479/sil.389648.mq591304. Archived from the original on 31 July 2011.
- Ferraris, Giovanni (March 2020). "Historical notes on anisotropy". Rendiconti Lincei. Scienze Fisiche e Naturali. 31 (1): 5–7. Bibcode:2020RLSFN..31....5F. doi:10.1007/s12210-020-00870-5.
- Fischer, Walther (1972). "Groth, Paul Heinrich von". In Gillispie, Charles Coulston (ed.). Dictionary of scientific biography. Vol. 5. New York: Scribner. pp. 556–558. ISBN 0684101165. Archived from the original on 19 October 2022.
- Fischer, Walther (1975). "Sénarmont, Henri Hureau De". In Gillispie, Charles Coulston (ed.). Dictionary of scientific biography. Vol. 12. New York: Scribner. pp. 303–306. ISBN 0684129248. Archived from the original on 16 November 2010.
- Fizeau, H. (1864). "Recherches sur la dilatation et la double réfraction du cristal de roche échauffé" [Research on expansion and double refraction of heated rock crystal]. Comptes rendus hebdomadaires des séances de l'Académie des sciences (in French). 58: 923–932. Archived from the original on 15 October 2007.
- Flack, H. D. (2009). "Louis Pasteur's discovery of molecular chirality and spontaneous resolution in 1848, together with a complete review of his crystallographic and chemical work" (PDF). Acta Crystallographica Section A. 65 (5): 371–389. Bibcode:2009AcCrA..65..371F. doi:10.1107/S0108767309024088. PMID 19687573. Archived from the original (PDF) on 8 September 2019.
- Fletcher, L. (December 1891). "The Optical Indicatrix and the Transmission of Light in Crystals". Mineralogical Magazine and Journal of the Mineralogical Society. 9 (44): 278–388. Bibcode:1891MinM....9..278F. doi:10.1180/minmag.1891.009.44.04.
- Flood, Raymond (2006). "Mathematics in Victorian Ireland". BSHM Bulletin: Journal of the British Society for the History of Mathematics. 21 (3): 200–211. doi:10.1080/17498430600964433. ISSN 1749-8430. S2CID 122564180.
- Flood, Raymond (2011). "Taking root: Mathematics in Victorian Ireland". In Flood, Raymond; Rice, Adrian; Wilson, Robin (eds.). Mathematics in Victorian Britain. Oxford University Press. pp. 103–119. ISBN 978-0-19-960139-4.
- Fresnel, A. (1822a). "Note sur la double réfraction du verre comprimé" [Note on the double refraction of pressed glass]. Annales de chimie et de physique. Série 2 (in French). 20: 376–383.
- Fresnel, Augustin (1866) [1822b]. "Mémoire sur la double réfraction que les rayons lumineux éprouvent en traversant les aiguilles de cristal de roche suivant des directions parallèles à l'axe" [Memoir on the double refraction that light rays undergo in traversing the needles of quartz in the directions parallel to the axis]. Oeuvres Complètes d'Augustin Fresnel (in French). Vol. 1. Paris: Imprimerie Impériale. pp. 731–751.
- Fresnel, A. (1827). "Mémoire sur la double réfraction" [Memoir on double refraction]. Mémoires de l'Académie des sciences de l'Institut de France (in French). 7: 45–176. Archived from the original on 22 October 2009.
- Fresnel, A. (1852). "Memoir on double refraction". In Taylor, Richard (ed.). Scientific Memoirs, selected from the Transactions of Foreign Academies of Science and Learned Societies, and from Foreign Journals. Vol. 5. Translated by Hobson, A.W. London: Taylor & Francis. pp. 238–333.
- Garten, V.; Head, R. (1966). "Crystalloluminescence". Nature. 209: 705. doi:10.1038/209705a0.
- Geison, Gerald L.; Secord, James A. (1988). "Pasteur and the Process of Discovery: The Case of Optical Isomerism". Isis. 79 (1): 6–36. doi:10.1086/354632. JSTOR 234439. PMID 3286576.
- Glan, P. (January 1877). "Ueber ein neues Photometer" [On a new photometer]. Annalen der Physik (in German). 237 [1] (7): 351–360. Bibcode:1877AnP...237..351G. doi:10.1002/andp.18772370704.
- Goldberg, Marvin C.; Weiner, Eugene R. (1989). "The Science of Luminescence". In Goldberg, Marvin C. (ed.). Luminescence Applications in Biological, Chemical, Environmental, and Hydrological Sciences. Washington, DC: American Chemical Society. p. 4. doi:10.1021/bk-1989-0383.ch001. ISBN 9780841215603.
- Goldbers, Stanley (1976). "Voigt, Woldemar". In Gillispie, Charles Coulston (ed.). Dictionary of scientific biography. Vol. 14. New York: Scribner. pp. 61–63. ISBN 0684129264. Archived from the original on 17 November 2010.
- Goldhammer, D. A. (January 1892). "Das Kerr'sche magnetooptische Phänomen und die magnetische Circularpolarisation nach der electrischen Lichttheorie" [Kerr’s magneto-optical phenomenon and the magnetic circular polarization according to the electrical light theory]. Annalen der Physik (in German). 282 [46] (5): 71–98. Bibcode:1892AnP...282...71G. doi:10.1002/andp.18922820504.
- Goldstein, E. (1894). "Über die Einwirkung von Kathodenstrahlen auf einige Salze" [About the effect of cathode rays on some salts]. Sitzungsberichte der Königlich Preussischen Akademie der Wissenschaften zu Berlin (in German). Juni-Dec 1894: 937–945.
- Gough, J. B. (1970). "Becquerel, Alexandre-Edmond". In Gillispie, Charles Coulston (ed.). Dictionary of scientific biography. Vol. 1. New York: Scribner. pp. 555–556. ISBN 0684169630. Archived from the original on 10 September 2012.
- Green, George (1837). "On the Laws of the Reflexion and Refraction of Light at the Common Surface of Two Noncrystallized Media". Transactions of the Cambridge Philosophical Society. 7: 1–24. doi:10.1190/1.9781560801931.ch3d.
- Haidinger, W. (January 1845). "Ueber den Pleochroismus der Krystalle" [On the pleochroism of crystals]. Annalen der Physik (in German). 141 [65] (5): 1–30. Bibcode:1845AnP...141....1H. doi:10.1002/andp.18451410502.
- Hamilton, William R. (1832). "Third Supplement to an Essay on the Theory of Systems of Rays". The Transactions of the Royal Irish Academy. 17: v–144. ISSN 0790-8113. JSTOR 30078785.
- Hamilton, William R. (1834). "On some results of the view of a characteristic function in optics". Report of the third meeting of the British Association for the Advancement of Science held at Cambridge in 1833. London: John Murray. pp. 360–370.
- Hankel, W. G. (January 1844). "Ueber die Thermo-Elektricität der Metalle und metallischen Mineralien (Erze)" [About the thermal electricity of metals and metallic minerals (ores)]. Annalen der Physik (in German). 138 [62] (6): 197–207. Bibcode:1844AnP...138..197H. doi:10.1002/andp.18441380604.
- Hankins, Thomas L. (1980). Sir William Rowan Hamilton. Baltimore: Johns Hopkins University Press. ISBN 0801822033.
- Harvey, E. Newton (1957). A history of luminescence from the earliest times until 1900. Philadelphia, PA: The American Philosophical Society.
- Haüy, René Just (1787). Exposition raisonné de la théorie de l'électricité et du magnétisme, d'après les principes d'Æpinus [Reasoned exposition of the theory of electricity and magnetism, based on the principles of Æpinus] (in French). Paris: Desaint.
- Herschel, John (31 December 1820). "On the action of crystallized bodies on homogeneous light, and on the causes of the deviation from Newton's scale in the tints which many of them develope on exposure to a polarised ray". Philosophical Transactions of the Royal Society of London. 110: 45–100. doi:10.1098/rstl.1820.0005.
- Herschel, J. F. W. (1821). "On the rotation impressed by plates of rock crystal on the planes of polarisation of the rays of light, as connected with certain peculiarities in its crystallisation". Transactions of the Cambridge Philosophical Society. 1: 43–52.
- Hoddeson, Lillian; Braun, Ernest; Teichmann, Jürgen; Weart, Spencer, eds. (1992). Out of the crystal maze: chapters from the history of solid state physics. New York: Oxford University Press. ISBN 0-19-505329-X.
- Hoffmann, D. (3 July 2006). "Paul Drude (1863–1906)". Annalen der Physik. 518 (7–8): 449–460. Bibcode:2006AnP...518..449H. doi:10.1002/andp.200651807-802.
- Hooykaas, R. (1972). "Haüy, René-Just". In Gillispie, Charles Coulston (ed.). Dictionary of scientific biography. Vol. 6. New York: Scribner. pp. 178–183. ISBN 0684101173. Archived from the original on 11 August 2021.
- Hoppe, Edmund (1926). "Geschichte Der Physik" [History of Physics]. Geschichte der Physik Vorlesungstechnik (in German). Braunschweig: Verlag von Friedr. Vieweg & Sohn. pp. 1–179. doi:10.1007/978-3-7091-9796-7_1.
- Huyghens, Christiaan (1690). Traité de la lumière [Treatise on light] (in French). Leiden: Pieter van der Aa. p. 94.
- Jackson, Roland (2 October 2015). "John Tyndall and the Early History of Diamagnetism". Annals of Science. 72 (4): 435–489. doi:10.1080/00033790.2014.929743. PMC 4524391. PMID 26221835.
- Kahr, Bart; McBride, J. Michael (January 1992). "Optically Anomalous Crystals". Angewandte Chemie International Edition in English. 31 (1): 1–26. doi:10.1002/anie.199200013.
- Katzir, Shaul (1 January 2003a). "The Discovery of the Piezoelectric Effect". Archive for History of Exact Sciences. 57 (1): 61–91. doi:10.1007/s00407-002-0059-5.
- Katzir, Shaul (1 September 2003b). "From explanation to description: molecular and phenomenological theories of piezoelectricity". Historical Studies in the Physical and Biological Sciences. 34 (1): 69–94. doi:10.1525/hsps.2003.34.1.69.
- Katzir, Shaul (September 2004). "The emergence of the principle of symmetry in physics". Historical Studies in the Physical and Biological Sciences. 35 (1): 35–65. doi:10.1525/hsps.2004.35.1.35.
- Katzir, Shaul (2006). The beginnings of piezoelectricity: a study in mundane physics. Dordrecht: Springer. ISBN 978-1-4020-4669-8.
- Kauffman, George B.; Myers, Robin D. (December 1998). "Pasteur's Resolution of Racemic Acid: A sesquicentennial Retrospect and a New Translation" (PDF). The Chemical Educator. 3 (6): 1–4. doi:10.1007/s00897980257a. Archived from the original (PDF) on 17 January 2006.
- Klang, Herrmann (January 1881). "Die Elasticitätsconstanten des Flussspathes" [The elasticity constants of fluorites]. Annalen der Physik (in German). 248 [12] (3): 321–335. Bibcode:1881AnP...248..321K. doi:10.1002/andp.18812480302.
- Knoblauch, H. (January 1851). "Ueber das Verhalten krystallisirter Körper zwischen elektrischen Polen" [On the behavior of crystal-clear bodies between electrical poles]. Annalen der Physik (in German). 159 (6): 289–299. Bibcode:1851AnP...159..289K. doi:10.1002/andp.18511590605.
- Kubbinga, Henk (January 2012). "Crystallography from Haüy to Laue: controversies on the molecular and atomistic nature of solids". Zeitschrift für Kristallographie. 227 (1): 1–26. Bibcode:2012ZK....227....1K. doi:10.1524/zkri.2012.1459.
- Kunz, George F. (1918). "The life and work of Haüy". The American Mineralogist. 3: 60–89.
- Lalena, John N. (April 2006). "From quartz to quasicrystals: probing nature's geometric patterns in crystalline substances". Crystallography Reviews. 12 (2): 125–180. Bibcode:2006CryRv..12..125L. doi:10.1080/08893110600838528.
- Lang, Sydney B. (1974). "History of pyroelectricity". Sourcebook of pyroelectricity. London New York Paris: Gordon and Breach science. pp. 85–156. ISBN 0677015801.
- Lang, S.B. (April 2004). "A 2400 year history of pyroelectricity: from Ancient Greece to exploration of the solar system". British Ceramic Transactions. 103 (2): 65–70. Bibcode:2004BrCTr.103...65L. doi:10.1179/096797804225012765.
- Laspeyres, H. (1 December 1880). "Mineralogische Bemerkungen" [Mineralogical remarks]. Zeitschrift für Kristallographie - Crystalline Materials (in German). 4 (1–6): 433–467. doi:10.1524/zkri.1880.4.1.433.
- Liebisch, Th. (1888). "Ueber eine Vorrichtung zur Beobachtung der äußeren konischen Refraction unter dem Mikroskop" [About a device for observing the external conical refraction under the microscope]. Nachrichten von der Gesellschaft der Wissenschaften zu Göttingen (in German): 124–127.
- Liebisch, Th. (1889). "Ueber thermoelektrische Ströme in Krystallen" [On thermoelectric currents in crystals]. Nachrichten von der Gesellschaft der Wissenschaften zu Göttingen (in German) (20): 531–535.
- Liebisch, Theodor (1891). Physikalische Krystallographie [Physical crystallography] (in German). Leipzig: Verlag Von Veit & Comp.
- Lippmann, G. (1881). "Principe de la conservation de l'électricité" [Principle of the conservation of electricity]. Annales de chimie et de physique (in French). 24: 145. Archived from the original on 2016-02-08.
- Lissajous, M. (1874). "Observations sur la note précédente: réfraction conique" [Comments on the previous note: conical refraction]. Journal de Physique Théorique et Appliquée (in French). 3 (1): 25–26. doi:10.1051/jphystap:01874003002501.
- Lloyd, Humphrey (1831). "On the Phenomena Presented by Light in Its Passage along the Axes of Biaxal Crystals". The Transactions of the Royal Irish Academy. 17: 145–157. ISSN 0790-8113. JSTOR 30078786.
- Lloyd, Humphrey (1833a). "On the phænomena presented by light in its passage along the axes of biaxal crystals". The London, Edinburgh, and Dublin Philosophical Magazine and Journal of Science. 2 (8): 112–120. doi:10.1080/14786443308647984.
- Lloyd, Humphrey (1833b). "Further experiments on the phænomena presented by light in its passage along the axes of biaxal crystals". The London, Edinburgh, and Dublin Philosophical Magazine and Journal of Science. 2 (9): 207–210. doi:10.1080/14786443308648010.
- MacCullagh, James (1830). "On the Double Refraction of Light in a Crystallized Medium, according to the Principles of Fresnel". The Transactions of the Royal Irish Academy. 16: 65–78. ISSN 0790-8113. JSTOR 30079025.
- MacLeod, Roy (1981). "Tyndall, John". In Gillispie, Charles Coulston (ed.). Dictionary of scientific biography. Vol. 13. New York: Scribner. pp. 521–524. ISBN 068416969X. Archived from the original on 11 October 2019.
- Malus, Étienne-Louis (1810). Théorie de la double réfraction de la lumière dans les substances cristallines [Theory of the double refraction of light in crystalline substances] (in French). Paris: Garnery.
- Mandarino, Joseph A. (1959). "Absorption and pleochroism: Two much-neglected optical properties of crystals" (PDF). The American Mineralogist. 44 (1–2): 65–77.
- Marbach, H. (January 1855). "Ueber die optischen Eigenschaften einiger Krystalle des tesseralen Systems" [On the optical properties of some crystals of the tesseral system]. Annalen der Physik (in German). 170 [94] (3): 412–426. Bibcode:1855AnP...170..412M. doi:10.1002/andp.18551700305.
- Matteucci, C. (1855a). "Sur certaines propriétés physiques du bismuth cristallisé" [On certain physical properties of crystallized bismuth]. Comptes rendus hebdomadaires des séances de l'Académie des sciences (in French). 40: 541–545.
- Matteucci, C. (1855b). "Supplément au mémoire communiqué à l'Académie sur certaines propriétés physiques du bismuth cristallisé" [Supplement to the memoir communicated to the Academy on certain physical properties of crystallized bismuth]. Comptes rendus hebdomadaires des séances de l'Académie des sciences (in French). 40: 913–914.
- Mauskopf, Seymour H. (July 1976). "Crystals and compounds: molecular structure and composition in nineteenth-century French science". Transactions of the American Philosophical Society. New series. 66 (3): 5–82. doi:10.2307/1006279. ISBN 0871696630. JSTOR 1006279.
- Minnigerode, B. (1884). "Untersuchungen über die Symmetrieverhältnisse und die Elasticität der Krystalle" [Investigation of the symmetry relations and elasticity of the crystal]. Nachrichten von der Königl. Gesellschaft der Wissenschaften und der Georg-Augusts-Universität zu Göttingen (in German): 374–384.
- Minnigerode, B. (1886). "Ueber Wärmeleitung in Krystallen" [About heat conduction in crystals]. Neues Jahrbuch für Mineralogie, Geologie und Paläontologie (in German). 1: 1–13.
- Minnigerode, B. (1887). "Untersuchungen über die Symmetrieverhältnisse der Krystalle" [Investigation of the symmetry relations of the crystal]. Neues Jahrbuch für Mineralogie, Geologie und Paläontologie (in German). 5: 145–166.
- Mitscherlich, E. (January 1824). "Ueber das Verhältniss der Form der krystallisirten Körper zur Ausdehnung durch die Wärme" [On the relationship between the form of crystals and their expansion by heat]. Annalen der Physik (in German). 77 [1] (5): 125–127. Bibcode:1824AnP....77..125M. doi:10.1002/andp.18240770507.
- Mohs, Friedrich (1822). Grundriss der Mineralogie [Outline of mineralogy] (in German). Dresden: Arnoldischen Buchhandlung. p. 374.
- Mönch, E. (1986). "A Historical Survey of the Development of Photoelasticity in Germany, Especially in Munich". In Nisida, Masataka; Kawata, Kozo (eds.). Photoelasticity. International Symposium on Photoelasticity. Tokyo: Springer. pp. 1–8. doi:10.1007/978-4-431-68039-0_1. ISBN 978-4-431-68039-0.
- Narasimhamurty, Tamma S. (1981). Photoelastic and Electro-Optic Properties of Crystals. Boston, MA: Springer US. p. vii. doi:10.1007/978-1-4757-0025-1. ISBN 978-1-4757-0027-5.
- Narasimhan, T. N. (1 August 2010). "Thermal conductivity through the 19th century". Physics Today. 63 (8): 36–41. arXiv:1005.2119. Bibcode:2010PhT....63h..36N. doi:10.1063/1.3480074.
- Navier, C. (1827). "Sur les lois de l'équilibre et du mouvement des corps solides élastiques" [On the laws of equilibrium and movement of elastic solid bodies]. Mémoires de l'Académie des sciences de l'Institut de France (in French). 7: 375–394.
- Neumann, F. E. (January 1832). "Theorie der doppelten Strahlenbrechung, abgeleitet aus den Gleichungen der Mechanik" [Theory of double beam refraction, derived from the equations of mechanics]. Annalen der Physik (in German). 101 (7): 418–454. Bibcode:1832AnP...101..418N. doi:10.1002/andp.18321010703.
- Neumann, F. E. (1834). "Ueber das Elasticitätsmaafs krystallinischer Substanzen der homoëdrischen Abtheilung" [On the elasticity of crystalline substances of the homohedral division]. Annalen der Physik und Chemie (in German). 31: 177–192.
- Neumann, F. E. (January 1841). "Die Gesetze der Doppelbrechung des Lichts in comprimirten oder ungleichförmig erwärmten unkrystallinischen Körpern" [The laws of birefringence of light in compressed or irregularly heated non-crystalline bodies]. Annalen der Physik (in German). 130 [54] (12): 449–476. Bibcode:1841AnP...130..449N. doi:10.1002/andp.18411301203.
- "Neumann's principle". Online Dictionary of Crystallography. International Union of Crystallography. 16 November 2017.
- Nichols, Ernest Fox (January 1897). "Ueber das Verhalten des Quarzes gegen Strahlen grosser Wellenlänge, untersucht nach der radiometrischen Methode" [On the behaviour of quartz with rays of large wavelength, investigated using the radiometric method]. Annalen der Physik (in German). 296 [60] (3): 401–417. Bibcode:1897AnP...296..401F. doi:10.1002/andp.18972960302.
- Nye, John Frederick (1990). Physical properties of crystals: their representation by tensors and matrices. Oxford: Clarendon Press. ISBN 0198511655.
- O'Hara, J. G. (1982). "The Prediction and Discovery of Conical Refraction by William Rowan Hamilton and Humphrey Lloyd (1832-1833)". Proceedings of the Royal Irish Academy. Section A: Mathematical and Physical Sciences. 82A (2): 231–257. ISSN 0035-8975. JSTOR 20489156.
- Ohba, Shigeru (2019). "More fun with quartz crytals!". IUCr Newsletter. 27 (1). IUCr.
- Oldenburg, Henry (26 May 1677). "An account of four sorts of factitions shining substances, communicated to the publisher from very good hands, both in printed papers and in letters not printed". Philosophical Transactions of the Royal Society of London. 12 (135): 867. doi:10.1098/rstl.1677.0015. JSTOR 101770.
- Orcel, Jean (1972). "Historical note". Microscopic study of opaque minerals. By Galopin, R.; Henry, N. F. M. (in French). Cambridge: W. Heffer and Sons. pp. 301–305. ISBN 978-0-85270-047-1.
- Pasteur, Louis (1848a). "Mémoire sur la relation qui peut exister entre la forme cristalline et la composition chimique, et sur la cause de la polarisation rotatoire" [Memoir on the relationship which can exist between crystalline form and chemical composition, and on the cause of rotary polarization]. Comptes Rendus de l'Académie des Sciences de Paris (in French). 26: 535–538. Archived from the original on 15 October 2007.
- Pearsall, Thos. J. (1830a). "On the effects of electricity upon minerals which are phosphorescent by heat". Journal of the Royal Institution of Great Britain. 1: 77–83. Archived from the original on 13 July 2008.
- Pearsall, Thos. J. (1830b). "Further experiments on the communication of phosphorescence and colour to bodies by electricity". Journal of the Royal Institution of Great Britain. 2: 267–281. Archived from the original on 13 July 2008.
- Plücker, J. (1847). "Ueber die Abstossung der optischen Axen der Krystalle durch die Pole der Magnete" [On the repulsion of the optical axes of the crystal by magnetic poles]. Annalen der Physik (in German). 72: 315–343.
- Plücker, J.; Beer, A. (1850). "Ueber die magnetischen Axen der Krystalle und ihre Beziehung zur Krystallform und den optischen Axen" [About the magnetic axes of the crystal and their relation to the crystal shape and the optical axes]. Annalen der Physik (in German). 81: 115–162.
- Plücker, J.; Beer, A. (1851). "Ueber die magnetischen Axen der Krystalle und ihre Beziehung zur Krystallform und den optischen Axen" [About the magnetic axes of the crystal and their relation to the crystal shape and the optical axes]. Annalen der Physik (in German). 82: 42–74.
- Pockels, Friedrich (January 1889). "Ueber den Einfluss elastischer Deformationen, speciell einseitigen Druckes, auf das optische Verhalten krystallinischer Körper" [The influence of elastic deformations, especially one-sided pressure, on the optical behaviour of crystalline bodies]. Annalen der Physik (in German). 273 [37] (6): 269–305. Bibcode:1889AnP...273..269P. doi:10.1002/andp.18892730604.
- Pockels, F. (January 1890). "Ueber die durch einseitigen Druck hervorgerufene Doppelbrechung regulärer Krystalle, speciell von Steinsalz und Sylvin" [About the birefringence of regular crystals, especially of rock salt and sylvite, caused by one-sided pressure]. Annalen der Physik (in German). 275 (3): 440–469. Bibcode:1890AnP...275..440P. doi:10.1002/andp.18902750313.
- Pockels, F. (1893). "Ueber den Einfluss des electrostatischen Feldes auf das optische Verhalten piezoelektrischer Krystalle" [The influence of the electrostatic field on the optical behavior of piezoelectric crystals]. Abhandlungen der Königlichen Gesellschaft der Wissenschaften in Göttingen (in German). 39: 1–204.
- Pockels, F. (1906). Lehrbuch der Kristalloptik [Textbook of crystal optics] (in German). Leipzig: Teubner. Bibcode:1906lekr.book.....P.
- Poisson, S. D. (1826). "Mémoire sur la théorie du magnétisme" [Memoir on the theory of magnetism]. Mémoires de l'Académie des sciences de l'Institut de France (in French). 5: 247–338.
- Poisson, S. D. (1829a). "Mémoire sur l'équilibre et le mouvement des corps élastiques" [Memoir on the balance and movement of elastic bodies]. Mémoires de l'Académie des sciences de l'Institut de France (in French). 8: 357–570.
- Poisson, S. D. (1829b). "Note sur le problème des ondes" [Note on the wave problem]. Mémoires de l'Académie des sciences de l'Institut de France (in French). 8: 571–580.
- "Pyroelectricity". Online Dictionary of Crystallography. International Union of Crystallography. 17 November 2017.
- Robertson, Edmund F.; O'Connor, John J. "The MacTutor History of Mathematics Archive: Biographies". School of Mathematics and Statistics, University of St Andrews.
- Röntgen, W. C.; Schneider, J. (January 1887). "Ueber die Compressibilität von verdünnten Salzlösungen und die des festen Chlornatriums" [On the compressibility of dilute saline solutions and solid chloride salts]. Annalen der Physik (in German). 267 [31] (8): 1000–1005. Bibcode:1887AnP...267.1000R. doi:10.1002/ANDP.18872670828.
- Root, Elihu (January 1876a). "Zur Kenntniss der dielektrischen Polarisation" [Towards an understanding of dielectric polarization]. Annalen der Physik (in German). 234 (5): 1–35. Bibcode:1876AnP...234....1R. doi:10.1002/andp.18762340503.
- Root, Elihu (January 1876b). "Zur Kenntniss der dielektrischen Polarisation" [Towards an understanding of dielectric polarization]. Annalen der Physik (in German). 234 (7): 425–461. Bibcode:1876AnP...234..425R. doi:10.1002/andp.18762340705.
- Rubens, H.; Aschkinass, E. (January 1898). "Die Reststrahlen von Steinsalz und Sylvin" [The residual rays of rock salt and sylvite]. Annalen der Physik (in German). 301 [65] (6): 241–256. Bibcode:1898AnP...301..241R. doi:10.1002/andp.18983010602.
- Rubens, H.; Nichols, E. F. (January 1897). "Versuche mit Wärmestrahlen von grosser Wellenlänge" [Experiments with thermal rays of large wavelength]. Annalen der Physik (in German). 296 [60] (3): 418–462. Bibcode:1897AnP...296..418R. doi:10.1002/andp.18972960303.
- Sarton, George (January 1932). "Discovery of Conical Refraction by William Rowan Hamilton and Humphrey Lloyd (1833)". Isis. 17 (1): 154–170. doi:10.1086/346641. ISSN 0021-1753. "I know of no person who has not seen conical refraction that really believed in it. I have myself converted a score of mathematicians by showing them the cone of light". Hamilton replied, "How different from me! If I had seen it only, I should not have believed it. My eyes have too often deceived me. I believe it, because I have proved it"
- Scholz, Erhard (1989b). "Crystallographic Symmetry Concepts and Group Theory (1850-1860)". In Rowe, David E.; McCleary, John (eds.). The history of modern mathematics: proceedings of the Symposium on the history of modern mathematics, Vassar college, Poughkeepsie, New York, June 20-24, 1988. New York London Toronto: Academic Press. pp. 3–27. ISBN 0125996624.
- Scholz, Erhard (1989c). "The rise of Symmetry Concepts in the Atomistic and Dynamistic Schools of Crystallography, 1815-1830". Revue d'histoire des sciences. 42 (1–2): 110–112. doi:10.3406/rhs.1989.4136.
- Scholz, Erhard (1994). "Crystallography". In Grattan-Guinness, I. (ed.). Companion Encyclopedia of the History and Philosophy of the Mathematical Sciences. Vol. 2. London: Routledge. pp. 1269–1274. ISBN 9780415092395.
- Schrauf, A. (January 1889). "Ueber die Verwendung einer Schwefelkugel zur Demonstration singulärer Schnitte an der Strahlenfläche" [About the use of a sulfur sphere for demonstrating singular cuts on the beam surface]. Annalen der Physik (in German). 273 [37] (5): 127–144. Bibcode:1889AnP...273..127S. doi:10.1002/andp.18892730508.
- Schuh, Curtis P. (2007). Mineralogy & Crystallography: On the History of these Sciences through 1919. Curtis Schuh. pp. 371–373.
- Schuh, Curtis (2013). "Liebisch, Theodor". Biobibliography of Mineralogy. The Mineralogical Record. Archived from the original on 26 March 2013.
- Schütt, Hans-Werner (1992). Eilhard Mitscherlich, Baumeister am Fundament der Chemie [Eilhard Mitscherlich, master builder of the foundation of chemistry] (in German). München: In Kommission bei R. Oldenbourg. ISBN 3486262734.
- Sénarmont, H. (1847). "Sur la conductibilité des substances cristallisées pour la chaleur" [On the heat conductivity of crystallized substances]. Annales de chimie et de physique. 3e série (in French). 21: 457–470.
- Sénarmont, H. (March 1850). "Mémoire sur la conductibilité superficielle des corps cristallisés pour l'électricité de tensions" [Memoir on the surface conductivity of crystallized bodies for voltage electricity]. Annales de chimie et de physique. 3e série (in French). 28: 257–278. Archived from the original on 15 October 2007.
- Sénarmont, H. (1854). "Experiénces sur la production artificielle du polychroïsme dans les substances crystallisées" [Experiments on the artificial production of polychroism in crystallized substances]. Annales de chimie et de physique (in French). 3: 319–336.
- Shinn, Terry (2013). "The silicon tide". In Buchwald, Jed Z.; Fox, Robert (eds.). The Oxford handbook of the history of physics (First ed.). Oxford; New York, NY: Oxford University Press. p. 868. ISBN 978-0-19-969625-3. "Much pre-twentieth-century study of crystals focused on their geometry, and mathematical description became increasingly central. There was then little reflection on the mechanical, optical, and electrical properties of crystals. This changed early in the twentieth century ..."
- Shtukenberg, A. G.; Punin, Yurii O. (2007). Kahr, Bart (ed.). Optically anomalous crystals. Dordrecht: Springer. ISBN 978-1-4020-5287-3.
- Sidot, T. (1866). "Recherches sur la cristallisation de quelques sulfures métalliques" [Research on the crystallization of some metal sulphides]. Comptes rendus hebdomadaires des séances de l'Académie des sciences (in French). 62: 999–1001.
- Shubnikov, A.V. (1988). "On the works of Pierre Curie on symmetry". Computers & Mathematics with Applications. 16 (5–8): 357–364. doi:10.1016/0898-1221(88)90225-8.
- Simonyi, Károly (2012). A cultural history of physics. Translated by Kramer, David. Boca Raton: CRC press. ISBN 978-1-56881-329-5.
- Sorby, H. C. (2 January 1858). "On the microscopical structure of crystals indicating the origin of minerals and rocks". Quarterly Journal of the Geological Society. 14 (1–2): 453–500. Bibcode:1858QJGS...14..453S. doi:10.1144/GSL.JGS.1858.014.01-02.44. S2CID 128592719.
- Sorby, H. C. (1864). "On the microscopical structure of meteorites". Proceedings of the Royal Society of London. 13: 333–334. doi:10.1098/rspl.1863.0075. S2CID 131171184.
- Stefan, J. (January 1864). "Ueber die Dispersion des Lichtes durch Drehung der Polarisationsebene im Quarz" [On the dispersion of light by rotation of the polarization plane in quartz]. Annalen der Physik (in German). 198 [122] (8): 631–634. Bibcode:1864AnP...198..631S. doi:10.1002/andp.18641980812.
- Stenger, Franz (January 1884). "Zur Wärmeleitungsfähigkeit des Turmalins" [The thermal conductivity of tourmaline]. Annalen der Physik (in German). 258 (8): 522–528. Bibcode:1884AnP...258..522S. doi:10.1002/andp.18842580806.
- Stokes, George Gabriel (1851). "On the Conduction of Heat in Crystals". The Cambridge and Dublin Mathematical Journal. 6: 215–238.
- Stokes, George Gabriel (1852). "On the Change of Refrangibility of Light". Philosophical Transactions of the Royal Society of London. 142: 463–562. doi:10.1098/rstl.1852.0022.
- Stokes, George Gabriel (1853). "On the Change of Refrangibility of Light – No. II". Philosophical Transactions of the Royal Society of London. 143: 385–396. doi:10.1098/rstl.1853.0016.
- Stokes, George Gabriel (2009) [1901]. "On the Conduction of Heat in Crystals". Mathematical and Physical Papers. Cambridge University Press. pp. 203–227. doi:10.1017/CBO9780511702266.008. ISBN 978-1-108-00264-6.
- Svanberg, J. (1850). "Expériences sur le pouvoir thermoélectrique du bismuth et de l'antimoine cristallisés" [Experiments on the thermoelectric power of crystallized bismuth and antimony]. Comptes rendus hebdomadaires des séances de l'Académie des sciences (in French). 31: 250–252.
- Thomson, William (1854a). "A mechanical theory of thermo-electric currents in crystalline solids". Mathematical and physical papers. Vol. 1. Cambridge University Press. pp. 324–325.
- Thomson, William (1854b). "On thermo-electric currents in linear conductors of crystalline sunstances". Mathematical and physical papers. Vol. 1. Cambridge University Press. pp. 266–291.
- Thomson, William (1854c). "On thermo-electricity in crystalline metals in a state of mechanical strain". Mathematical and physical papers. Vol. 1. Cambridge University Press. pp. 467–468.
- Thomson, William (1857a). "On the Dynamical Theory of Heat. Part V. Thermo-electric Currents". Transactions of the Royal Society of Edinburgh. 21 (1): 123–171. doi:10.1017/S0080456800032014.
- Thomson, William (1857b). "On the thermo-elastic, thermo-magnetic and pyro-electric properties of matter". The Quarterly Journal of Pure and Applied Mathematics. 1: 57–77.
- Thomson, William (1878). "On the thermoelastic, thermomagnetic and pyroelectric properties of matter". Philosophical Magazine. Series 5. 5 (28): 4–26. doi:10.1080/14786447808639378.
- Tutton, A. E. H. (1922). "Elasticity of crystals and its measurement". Crystallography and practical crystal measurement. Vol. 2: Physical and Chemical (2nd ed.). London: Macmillan & Co. p. 1337.
- Tyndall, John (September 1851). "On diamagnetism and magnecrystallic action". The London, Edinburgh, and Dublin Philosophical Magazine and Journal of Science. 2 (10): 165–188. doi:10.1080/14786445108646857.
- Tyndall, John (September 1855a). "On the nature of the force by which bodies are repelled from the poles of a magnet; to which is prefixed, an account of some experiments on molecular influences". The London, Edinburgh, and Dublin Philosophical Magazine and Journal of Science. 10 (65): 153–179. doi:10.1080/14786445508641950.
- Tyndall, John (October 1855b). "On the nature of the force by which bodies are repelled from the poles of a magnet; to which is prefixed, an account of some experiments on molecular influences". The London, Edinburgh, and Dublin Philosophical Magazine and Journal of Science. 10 (66): 257–290. doi:10.1080/14786445508641969.
- Tyndall, John (February 1856). "On the relation of diamagnetic polarity to magnecrystallic action". The London, Edinburgh, and Dublin Philosophical Magazine and Journal of Science. 11 (70): 125–137. doi:10.1080/14786445608642034.
- Tyndall, John (1870). Researches on diamagnetism and magne-crystallic action. London: Longmans, Green, and co.
- Tyndall, John; Knoblauch, Hermann (March 1850). "On the deportment of crystalline bodies between the poles of a magnet". The London, Edinburgh, and Dublin Philosophical Magazine and Journal of Science. 36 (242): 178–183. doi:10.1080/14786445008646457.
- Valeur, Bernard; Berberan-Santos, Mário N. (1 June 2011). "A Brief History of Fluorescence and Phosphorescence before the Emergence of Quantum Theory". Journal of Chemical Education. 88 (6): 731–738. Bibcode:2011JChEd..88..731V. doi:10.1021/ed100182h.
- Voigt, Woldemar (1874). Untersuchung der Elasticitätsverhältnisse des Steinsalzes [Investigation of the elasticity of rock salt] (Doctoral thesis) (in German). Leipzig: E. Pöschel. doi:10.58016/retro_991016492889706476_004099.
- Voigt, Woldemar (1876). "Bestimmung der Elasticitätsconstaten des Steinsalzes" [Determination of the elasticity of rock salt]. Annalen der Physik und Chemie Erganzung (in German). 7: 177–214.
- Voigt, W. (1885). "Erklärung der Farbenerscheinungen pleochroitischer Krystalle" [Explanation of color manifestations in pleochroic crystals.]. Neues Jahrbuch für Mineralogie, Geologie und Paläontologie (in German): 119–141.
- Voigt, W. (1888). "Bestimmung der Elasticitätsconstanten von Flusspath, Pyrit, Steinsalz, Sylvin" [Determination of the elasticity constants of fluorite, pyrite, rock salt, sylvite]. Annalen der Physik und Chemie (in German). 35 (12): 642–661.
- Voigt, W. (1890a). "Ueber die innere Reibung der festen Körper, inbesondere der Krystalle" [About the internal friction of solid bodies, especially crystals]. Abhandlungen der Königlichen Gesellschaft der Wissenschaften zu Göttingen (in German). 36: 1–47.
- Voigt, W. (1890b). "Allgemeine Theorie der piëzo- und pyroelectrischen Erscheinungen an Krystallen" [General theory of piëzo and pyroelectric phenomena in crystals]. Abhandlungen der Königlichen Gesellschaft der Wissenschaften zu Göttingen (in German). 36: 47–99.
- Voigt, W. (1897). "Versuch zur Bestimmung des wahren specifischen electrischen Momentes eines Turmalins" [Experiment to determine the true specific electric moment of tourmaline]. Annalen der Physik (in German). 60: 368–375.
- Voigt, Woldemar (1898). Die fundamentalen physikalischen Eigenschaften der Krystalle in elementarer Darstellung [The fundamental physical properties of crystals in an elementary presentation] (in German). Leipzig: Von Veit. p. 20. "Wir wollen uns deshalb nur darauf stützen, dass Zustände der geschilderten Art bei Spannungen und Dehnungen nicht starrer Körper auftreten, und sie deshalb tensorielle, die für sie charakteristischen physikalischen Grössen aber Tensoren nennen. [We therefore want [our presentation] to be based only on [the assumption that] conditions of the type described occur during stresses and strains of non-rigid bodies, and therefore call them "tensorial" but call the characteristic physical quantities for them "tensors".]"
- Weiser, Harry B. (1 October 1918). "Crystalloluminescence". The Journal of Physical Chemistry. 22 (7): 480–509. doi:10.1021/j150187a002.
- Weiss, Pierre (1896). "Recherches sur l'aimantation de la magnétite cristallisée" [Research on magnetization of crystallized magnetite]. Journal de Physique Théorique et Appliquée (in French). 5 (1): 435–453. doi:10.1051/jphystap:018960050043500.
- Wiedemann, Eilhard (January 1888). "Ueber Fluorescenz und Phosphorescenz I. Abhandlung" [On Fluorescence and Phosphorescence]. Annalen der Physik (in German). 270 [34] (7): 446–463. Bibcode:1888AnP...270..446W. doi:10.1002/andp.18882700703.
- Wilk, Stephen R. (2013). "Thomas J. Pearsall and the Ultraviolet". How the Ray Gun Got Its Zap: Odd Excursions into Optics. Cary: Oxford University Press. pp. 80–84. ISBN 978-0-19-994801-7.
- Wooster, W. A. (1990). "Brief history of physical crystallography". In Lima-de-Faria, J. (ed.). Historical atlas of crystallography. Dordrecht; Boston: Published for International Union of Crystallography by Kluwer Academic Publishers. pp. 61–75. ISBN 079230649X.
- Wyart, Jean (1971). "Curie, Pierre". In Gillispie, Charles Coulston (ed.). Dictionary of scientific biography. Vol. 3. New York: Scribner. pp. 503–508. ISBN 0684169649. Archived from the original on 23 February 2024.
- Xu, Jian; Tanabe, Setsuhisa (January 2019). "Persistent luminescence instead of phosphorescence: History, mechanism, and perspective". Journal of Luminescence. 205: 581–620. Bibcode:2019JLum..205..581X. doi:10.1016/j.jlumin.2018.09.047.
- Zink, Jeffrey I.; Chandra, B. P. (January 1982). "Light emission during growth and destruction of crystals. Crystalloluminescence and triboluminescence". The Journal of Physical Chemistry. 86 (1): 5–7. doi:10.1021/j100390a003.
