= Ernst Christian Neumann =

German pathologist (1834–1918)

Franz Ernst Christian Neumann (30 January 1834 – 6 March 1918) was a German pathologist who was a native of Königsberg. His common name was Ernst Neumann.

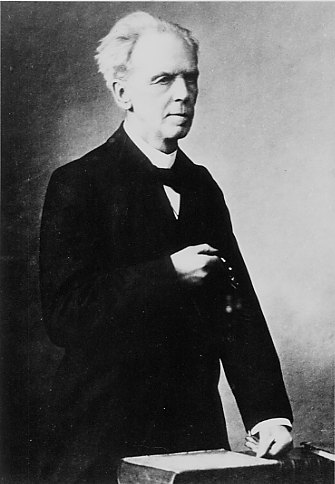
Ernst Neumann, on the desk of the Institute of Pathologie, Königsberg towards 1900

== Life ==
He was the son of physicist Franz Ernst Neumann (1798–1895), and grandson of chemist Karl Gottfried Hagen (1749–1829). He had two noted brothers, mathematician Carl Gottfried Neumann (1832–1925) and economist Friedrich Julius Neumann (1835–1910).

In 1855 he obtained his doctorate from Albertina Universität Königsberg, where one of his instructors was Hermann von Helmholtz. He performed post-graduate studies in Prague, and in Berlin under Rudolf Virchow (1821–1902). From 1866 until 1903 he was in charge of the Pathological Institute at Konigsberg. Neumann was awarded honorary degrees from the Universities of Tübingen (1898) and Geneva (1914). In 1995, the first International Ernst Neumann Award has been initiated by the 24.Meeting of "International Society for Experimental Hematology in Düsseldorf/ Germany. The first recipient of this award was Donald Medcalf from Melbourne

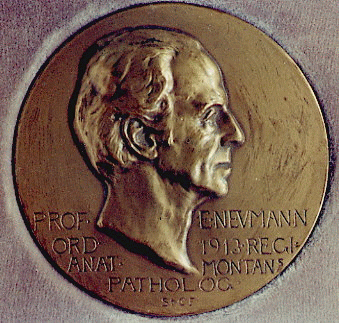
Ernst Neumann Bronze-Medal (d=6 cm) produced by Stanislaus Cauer for the 80th birthday of Neumann given by the university, his friends and colleagues in 1913 for his hematological work.

== Scientific career ==
Ernst Neumann made many contributions in the field of hematology. He demonstrated that erythropoiesis and leukopoiesis formulate in the bone marrow. "Ernst Neumann postulated a common stem cell for all hematopoietic cells".

In 2007, Zech et al. wrote: "The beginning of Stem Cell research can be dated back to Ernst Neumann, who was appointed professor of pathology at Koenigsberg in 1866 and described in a preliminary communication the presence of nucleated red blood cells in bone marrow (BM) saps. He concluded in his subsequent papers, that during postembryonic life, erythropoiesis and leukopoiesis are taking place in the BM. On the basis of his observation, Ernst Neumann was the first to postulate the BM as blood forming organ with a common SC for all hematopoietic cells"

"Among his "firsts" were the identification of leukemia and of pernicious anemia as diseases of the marrow. He coined the term myelogeneous leukemia, (today's acute myeloid leukemia), and described in 1882 the law of dissemination concerning yellow and red bone marrow: "Again, it was Neumann who provided us with the classic statement. In 1882, he enunciated the rule governing the development of yellow marrow. In effect, he recognized a phenomenon that is sometimes referred to us as "Neumann's law". It states that at birth all bones that contain marrow contain red marrow. With age, the blood producing activity contracts toward the center of the body, leaving the more peripheral bones with only fatty marrow. For about 50 years, students of the marrow did not know what to make of this phenomenon"

Neumann was supported by Giulio Bizzozero and by Claude Bernard, Alexander Maximov and Artur Pappenheim, but there were also Rudolf Virchow, Paul Ehrlich, Pouchet and Georges Hayem to repudiate him. "Despite all the opposition, however, within two decades, Neumann's discovery was a scientific axiom! The brilliance of the truth may first be blinding, but ultimately it supersedes all artificial illuminators"

In 1871, Neumann described congenital epulis (CE) of the newborn. Neumann also published an early work on medical electrodiagnosis and formed the name "Hämosiderin" as hematological pigment.

== History of Stem-Cell ==
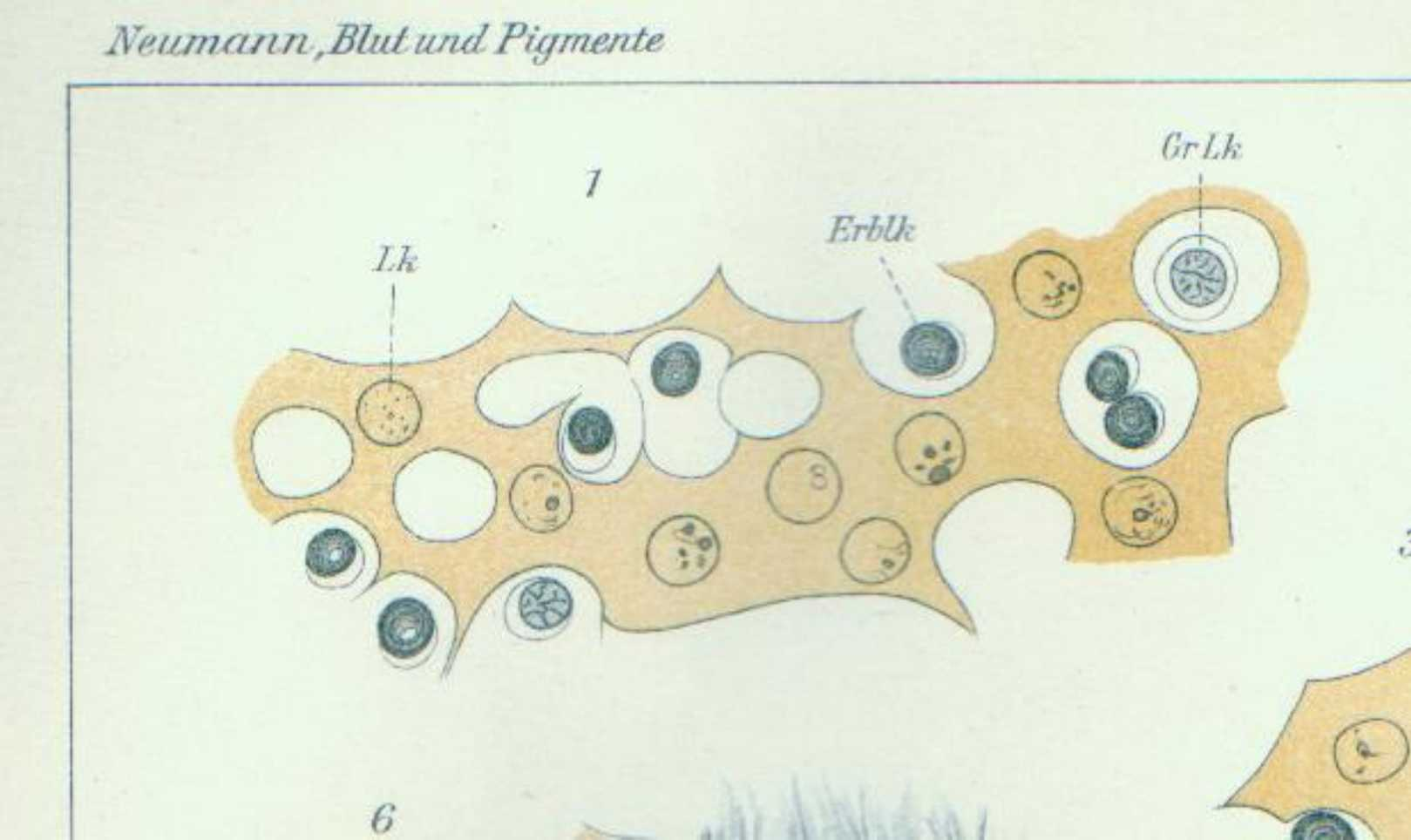

Legend of the stem cell-picture: Draft by Ernst Neumann himself, showing the "great-lymphozyt-stem-cell" (1912) or "great-lymphocyt" as stem cell for the postembryonic and embryonic development of erythropoiesis and leukopoiesis in the bone marrow and, as shown here, in the embryonic liver; GrLK: nucleus of great-lymphocyt-stem-cell; Erblk: Erythroblast; (Neumann 1914).

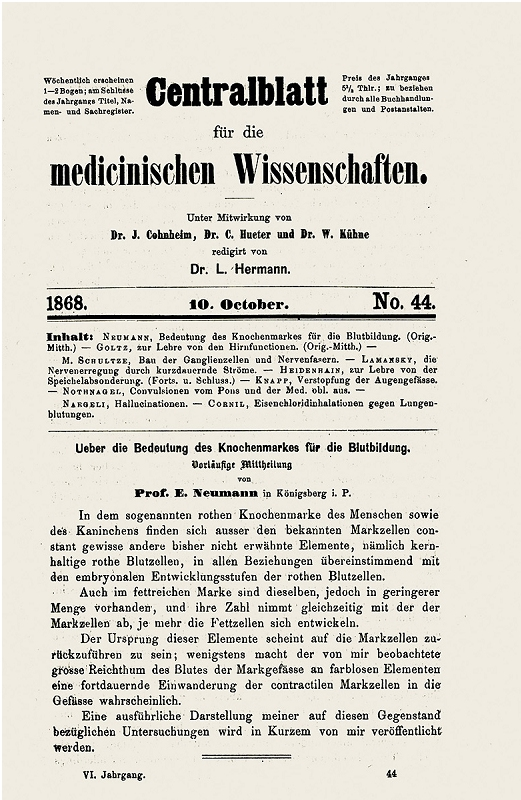
First announcement: Bone Marrow is the bloodforming organ: 1868-10-10

The text in the adjacent image describes the first announcement of the bone marrow as blood forming organ. Translation: In the so-called red bone marrow of man as well as the rabbit, one can regularly find, in addition to the well known marrow cell, certain other elements which have not been mentioned until now; namely nucleated red blood cells, in every respect corresponding to embryonic stages of the red blood cells. Also is the marrow rich in fat, the same cells are present but in lower quantity and their number decreases parallel to the decrease in the number of marrow cells and the increase in the number of fat cells (see above "Neumann-Law"). It is possible, to trace the origin of these elements in the blood of the marrow cells The high content of colorless elements in the blood of the marrow makes it likely that these is a migration of contractile marrow cells into the vessels. A thorough description of my observations will be published.

In 1869, Neumann described the "lymphoid marrow cell" in the bone marrow. "It is evident, that a continuing transformation of lymphoid cells into coloured blood cells takes place in the bone marrow during the whole life" (Neumann 1869 and B.P., p.19). This "lymphoid marrow cell" forms not only the erythropoiesis but it is capable (in itself) to self regeneration: "In order of the size differences of the lymphoid marrow-cells, we will be able to suppose that a permanent fluctuation will take place in the bone marrow" (Neumann 1869 and B.P. p.30). Until 1912 Neumann called the stem cell "lymphocyte", "great lymphocyte" or "lymphomyeloblast". Since that time, he declared: "The different forms of all blood cells happening in the blood, the lymph-organs and in the bone marrow are all descendants of the great-lymphocytic stem cell." (Neumann 1912, also B.P., page 313). "In which way this stem cell completes itself again and again, whether exclusively by a mitotic division or also from other cells particularly from cells of the mesenteric tissue, may be discussed" (Neumann 1912, also B.P. page 313). Neumann was advocate of the Unitarien Point of View: All blood cells shall be descended from this post embryonic stem cell. As it is well known, a quarrel broke out between dualists and unitarians (Paul Ehrlich). Neumann's farsightedness demanded a stem cell culture for the completion of the quarrel: "Perhaps a final decision will only arrive, if it possible, to isolate the individual colourless cells and to study its life events in vitro culture for some time, as Robert Koch demonstrated with the bacteria" (Neumann 1912, B.P., p. 329).

== Commentary by referents ==
1983 "Neumanns discovery was announced in the form of a preliminary report (10.10.1868). The promised thorough description appeared the next year in an extensive article (1869). In the interim, two communications appeared in Italian and were soon translated in the Centralblatt (late 1868 and late 1869). They were both by G.Bizzozero, Turin. … Of the two, Neumann was a more persistent student of the subject. He continued his work on the marrow, and toward the end of the century produced other classic contributions. Among his "firsts" were the identification of leukemia and of pernicious anemia as diseases of the marrow. He coined the term myelogeneous leukemia. Like Immanuel Kant, Neumann preferred to remain a lifelong citizen of Koenigsberg, where he taught and worked almost all his life on blood production and blood pigments. His superb literary taste, reflected in his masterful German writings, provides the profile of a German scholar in the classical sense. ... Despite the intensity of the search, Neumanns observations did not catch on easily. His ideas were received with the same skepticism with which Immanual Kant's Critique of Pure Reason had been greeted almost a century before. Neumann was supported by Bizzozero and by Claude Bernard, but there were also Pouchet and Hayem to repudiate him and Robin to accuse him of adding to the confusion by postulating yet another theory. Georges Hayem wrote an entire book in repudiation of Bizzozero. The preface of this book, despite a hauhty tone, is but a -lamentoso- for plausible theories that were about to sink. Later, in reference to Hayem, Jolly deplored the "unfortunate" influence that did not permit Neumann's theory to be accepted universally for about 20 years"

1985: "Neumann and Bizzozero reported observations and drew conclusions that were so revolutionary that they were not accepted".

1992:"Neumann bringt 1880 wiederholt zum Ausdruck, daß sich die Vorstufen von kernhaltigen roten Blutkörperchen postembryonal über die lymphozytäre Stammzelle aus neugebildetem Knochenmark entwickeln"

1994: "Es ist faszinierend, die scharfsinnige Argumentation Ernst Neumanns zu verfolgen, wie er ohne Polemik die komplexe Problematik darstellt ("eine gemeinsame, auch im postembryonalen Leben stets vorkommende groß-lymphozytäre Stammzelle", E.Neumann 1912) und gewissermaßen bis in den letzten Winkel hinein ausdiskutiert".

1995: Until the late nineteenth century blood cell formation was thought to be the prerogative of the lymph nodes or the liver and spleen. In 1868 Neumann and Bizzozero independently observed nucleated blood cells in material squeezed from the ribs of human cadavers and proposed that the marrow is the major source of blood cells

2007: Quotation see above in summary: Scientific career

2011: "At the same time, blood stem cells were conceptualized by histologists such as Ernst Neumann and Artur Pappenheim in studies of physiological haematopoiesis and various forms of leukaemia." "Ernst Neumann pointed to the first successes of Carrel in tissue culturing as a reason for his hope that blood cell cultures might in future be produced as well (1912, p.382)"

== Literature ==
- Askanazy, M.: Ernst Neumann; Zbl. f. Allg. Path. u. Path. Anatomie 29 (1918), S.409-421 und Verh. dt. Path. Ges. 28 (1935), S. 363-372 (contains a list of all publications of Ernst Neumann)
- Brittinger, G. Life and work of Ernst Neumann. Manuskript Festvortrag zur Verleihung des Ernst Neumann-Award 1995 in Düsseldorf (ask Neumann-Meding)
- Buzmann, C.: Der Pathologe Ernst Neumann und seine Forschung auf dem Gebiet der Degeneration und Regeneration periferer Nerven nach Kontinuitätstrennung. Dissertation, Medizinische Hochschule Hannover August 2003.
- Dinser, Ricarda: Der Beitrag Artur Pappenheims zur Hämatologie um die Jahrhundertwende Inaugural-Dissertation zur Erlangung des Doktorgrades der Medizin einer Hohen Medizinischen Fakultät der Ruhr-Universität Bochum 2001.
- Klinger, Y.: Über die Entdeckung der hämatopoetischen Funktion des Knochenmarks und das Postulat der Stammzelle. Von der Hypothese Ernst Neumanns zum experim. Beweis. Inaug.-Dissertation Bochum 1992
- Kühböck, J.: Hundert Jahre funktionelle Morphologie des Knochenmarks: Zur Erinnerung an Ernst Neumann, Clio medica, Vol.4, (1969), S.121-125 (nach Vol.4: Pergamon Press, Printed in GB).
- Lawrynovicz, K. Albertina. 1. Ausgabe in russ. Sprache: Otscherki istorii Kenigsbergskogo universiteta. K 450-letiju so wremieni osnawanija 1995;
- Lawrynovicz, K. Albertina. Erw. deutsche Ausgabe: Der Göttinger Arbeitskreis: Veröff. Nr.495 Dunker und Humblot, 1999
- Neumann, H.A.; Klinger, Y.: Knochenmark und Stammzelle. Der Kampf um die Grundlagen der Hämatologie. Ex libris Roche Bd.1 Blackwell Verlag Berlin 1994
- Neumann-Redlin von Meding, E.: Der Pathologe Ernst Neumann und sein Beitrag zur Begründung der Hämatologie im 19. Jahrhundert. Schriftenreihe der Münchner Vereinigung für Geschichte der Medizin e.V. Bd. Nr.18 Demeter Verlag München 1987 (contains a list of all publications of Ernst Neumann)
- Neumann-Redlin von Meding, E: Ernst Chr. Neumann (1834–1918); Die Beschreibung der funktionellen Morphologie des Knochenmarks am Pathologischen Institut Königsberg und dessen Einfluß auf die Hämatolgie des 19.Jahrhunderts. in: Jahrbuch der Albertus Univ. Königsbg. Bd.29 (1994) (425-437) Hrsg. Rauchning, D. et al. in: Die Albertus Universität zu Königsberg und ihre Professoren. Duncker u.Humblot Berlin
- Neumann-Redlin von Meding, E.: 130 Jahre Zytologi(e)´sches Fundament der modernen Hämatologie des 19. Jahrhunderts (Ernst Neumann). Verhandl. Schweiz./Deutsch/Österr. Gesell.f. Zytologie Jahrestag 2001 Films. Urban u. Fischer München/Jena S. 101-105 (with quotations of Wintrobe, Tavassoli in English)
- Pappenheim, A.: Einladung Ernst Neumann zu dem 1. Hämatologenkongress Berlin 1910. Folia haematologica, Bd. 9 (1910) 98-99
- Rosenow, G.: Ernst Neumann. His Significance in Today's Hematology. Karger Gazette Basel Nr. 15 (1967) 8
- Tavassoli, M.: Bone Marrow. Structure and Funktion. Alan R.Liss. Inc. New York, 1983
- Tavassoli, M.: Bone Marrow. The Seebed of Blood, in Wintrobe, M.M: Blood, pure and eloquent. A story of Discovery, of People and of Ideas. Mc.Graw-Hill Book Company Leo Febiger Philadelphia 1980
- Wintrobe, M.: Hematology, the Blossoming of a Science; a Story of Inspiration and Effort. Lea & Febiger Philadelphia 1985
- Zech, N.H., Shkumatov, A. Koestenbauer, S: Die magic behind stem cells. Journal of Assisted Reproduction and Genetics Vol. 24, Nr. 6 (2007) 208-214

== Associated eponyms ==
- Neumann's cells: Nucleated cells in the bone marrow in which red blood corpuscles originate.
- Neumann's sheath: Dentinal sheath which form the walls of the dentinal tubules.
- Rouget-Neumann sheath: Uncalcified bone matrix between an osteocyte and the lacunar or canalicular wall. Named with French physiologist Charles Rouget (1824–1904).
- Neumann tumour: Congenital epulis
- Neumann's law: see above
- "Charcot-Neumann-Leyden-Kristalle"

== Literature of Ernst Neumann ==
- Neumann, E.: Beiträge zur Kenntniss des Zahnbein- und Knochengewebes. Leipzig, 1863.
- Neumann, E.: Ueber das verschiedene Verhaltung gelähmter Muskeln gegen den constanten und inducirten Strom und die Erklärung desselben. Deutsche Klinik, Berlin, 1864, 16: 65-69 (One of the first publications on electrodiagnosis).
- Neumann, E.: Über die Bedeutung des Knochenmarks für die Blutbildung, Centralblatt für die Med. Wissenschaft 44 (1868) 689
- Neumann, E.: Über die Bedeutung des Knochenmarks f.d. Blutbildung, Ein Beitrag zur Entwicklungsgesch. der Blutkörperchen, Archiv f. Heilkunde 10 (1869) 68-102 (Wagners Archiv)
- Neumann, E.: Ein Fall von Leukämie mit Erkrankung des Knochenmarks Anhang: Salkowski: Chemische Untersuchungen des leukämischen Markes (28.7.69)Archiv der Heilkunde (Wagners Archiv) Bd. XI, (1871) 1-15
- Neumann, E.: Das Gesetz über die Verbreitung des gelben und rotten Knochenmarks, Centralblatt für die Med. Wissenschaft. 18 (1882) 321-323
- Neumann, E.: Hämatologische Studien I: Über die Blutbildung beim Frosche, Virchows Archiv 143 (1896) 225-277
- Neumann, E.: Hämatologische Studien II. die Variabilität der Leukozyten etc., Virchow Archiv 207 (1903) 41-78
- Neumann, E.: Hämatologische Studien III. Leukozyten und Leukämie, Virch. Arch. 207 (1912) 379-412
- Neumann, E.: Neuer Beitrag zur Kenntnis der embryonalen Leber, Arch.f.mikr. Anat 85, Abt.I (1914) 480-520
- Neumann, E.: Blut und Pigmente (B.P.). Gesammelte Abhandlungen mit Zusätzen, Fischer, G. Jena 1917, contains all publications of Neumann with reference to hematology and pigments.
