= Chitosan =

Polysaccharide from crustacean shells

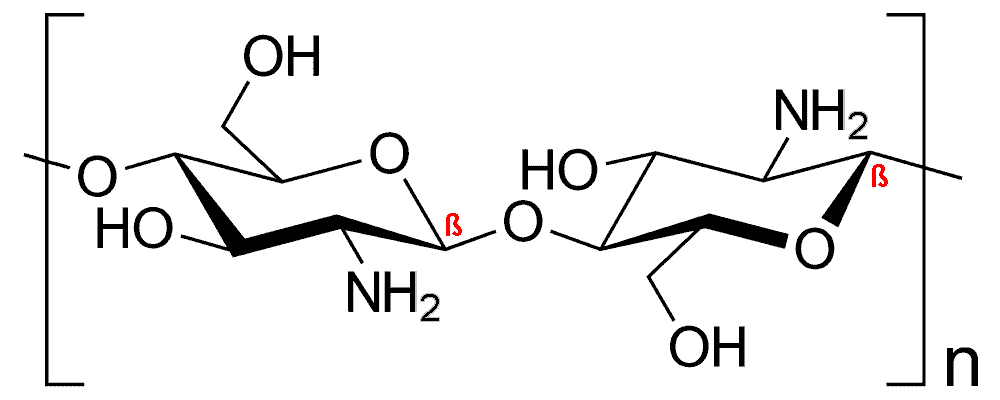
- Structure of completely deacetylated chitosan

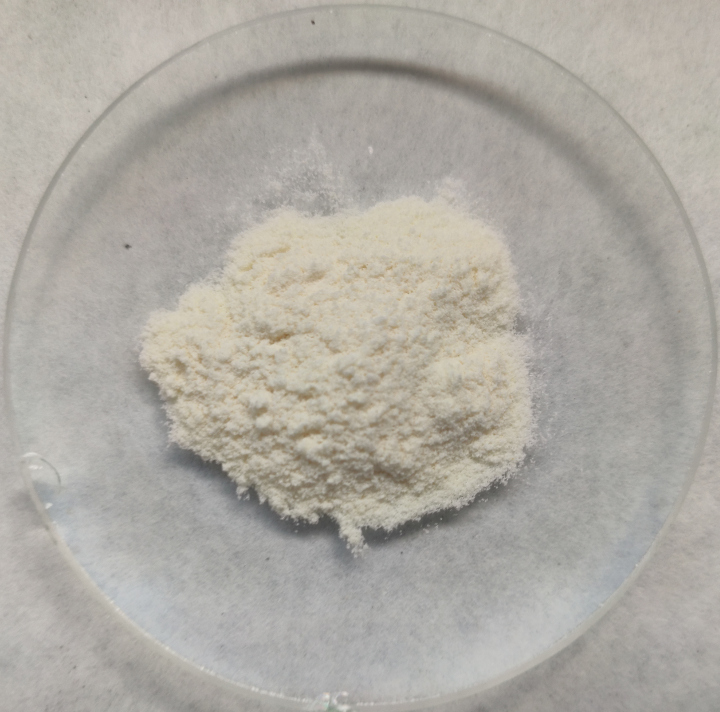

Names
- Other names Poliglusam; Deacetylchitin; Poly-(D)glucosamine; BC; Chitopearl; Chitopharm; Flonac; Kytex

Identifiers
CAS Number	9012-76-4
3D model (JSmol)	Interactive image
ChemSpider	64870
ECHA InfoCard	100.122.259
EC Number	618-480-0
PubChem CID	71853
UNII	23R93M6Y64
CompTox Dashboard (EPA)	DTXSID6030992
- InChI: InChI=1S/C56H103N9O39/c1-87-56(86)65-28-38(84)46(19(10-74)96-55(28)104-45-18(9-73)95-49(27(64)37(45)83)97-39-12(3-67)88-47(85)20(57)31(39)77)103-54-26(63)36(82)44(17(8-72)94-54)102-53-25(62)35(81)43(16(7-71)93-53)101-52-24(61)34(80)42(15(6-70)92-52)100-51-23(60)33(79)41(14(5-69)91-51)99-50-22(59)32(78)40(13(4-68)90-50)98-48-21(58)30(76)29(75)11(2-66)89-48/h11-55,66-85H,2-10,57-64H2,1H3,(H,65,86)/t11-,12-,13-,14-,15-,16-,17-,18-,19-,20-,21-,22-,23-,24-,25-,26-,27-,28-,29-,30-,31-,32-,33-,34-,35-,36-,37-,38-,39-,40-,41-,42-,43-,44-,45-,46-,47-,48+,49+,50+,51+,52+,53+,54+,55+/m1/s1 Key: FLASNYPZGWUPSU-SICDJOISSA-N; InChI=1/C56H103N9O39/c1-87-56(86)65-28-38(84)46(19(10-74)96-55(28)104-45-18(9-73)95-49(27(64)37(45)83)97-39-12(3-67)88-47(85)20(57)31(39)77)103-54-26(63)36(82)44(17(8-72)94-54)102-53-25(62)35(81)43(16(7-71)93-53)101-52-24(61)34(80)42(15(6-70)92-52)100-51-23(60)33(79)41(14(5-69)91-51)99-50-22(59)32(78)40(13(4-68)90-50)98-48-21(58)30(76)29(75)11(2-66)89-48/h11-55,66-85H,2-10,57-64H2,1H3,(H,65,86)/t11-,12-,13-,14-,15-,16-,17-,18-,19-,20-,21-,22-,23-,24-,25-,26-,27-,28-,29-,30-,31-,32-,33-,34-,35-,36-,37-,38-,39-,40-,41-,42-,43-,44-,45-,46-,47-,48+,49+,50+,51+,52+,53+,54+,55+/m1/s1 Key: FLASNYPZGWUPSU-SICDJOISBY
- SMILES: COC(=O)N[C@@H]1[C@H]([C@@H]([C@H](O[C@H]1O[C@@H]2[C@H](O[C@H]([C@@H]([C@H]2O)N)O[C@@H]3[C@H](O[C@H]([C@@H]([C@H]3O)N)O)CO)CO)CO)O[C@H]4[C@@H]([C@H]([C@@H]([C@H](O4)CO)O[C@H]5[C@@H]([C@H]([C@@H]([C@H](O5)CO)O[C@H]6[C@@H]([C@H]([C@@H]([C@H](O6)CO)O[C@H]7[C@@H]([C@H]([C@@H]([C@H](O7)CO)O[C@H]8[C@@H]([C@H]([C@@H]([C@H](O8)CO)O[C@H]9[C@@H]([C@H]([C@@H]([C@H](O9)CO)O)O)N)O)N)O)N)O)N)O)N)O)N)O

Related compounds
Related compounds	D-glucosamine and N-acetylglucosamine (monomers)
- Except where otherwise noted, data are given for materials in their standard state (at 25 °C [77 °F], 100 kPa). verify (what is ?) Infobox references

Chitosan /ˈkaɪtəsæn/ is a linear polysaccharide composed of randomly distributed β-(1→4)-linked D-glucosamine (deacetylated unit) and N-acetyl-D-glucosamine (acetylated unit). It is made by treating the chitin shells of shrimp and other crustaceans like crab, lobsters, and prawns with an alkaline substance, such as sodium hydroxide.

Chitosan has a number of commercial and possible biomedical uses. It can be used in agriculture as a seed treatment and biopesticide, helping plants to fight off fungal infections. In winemaking, it can be used as a fining agent, also helping to prevent spoilage. In industry, it can be used in a self-healing polyurethane paint coating. In medicine, it is useful in bandages (in the form of chitosan hydrocolloid dressing) to reduce bleeding and as an antibacterial agent; it can also be used to help deliver drugs through the skin.

== History ==
In 1799, British chemist Charles Hatchett experimented with decalcifying the shells of various crustaceans, finding that a soft, yellow and cartilage-like substance was left behind that is now known to be chitin. In 1859, French physiologist Charles Marie Benjamin Rouget found that boiling chitin in potassium hydroxide solution could deacetylate it to produce a substance that was soluble in dilute organic acids, that he called chitine modifiée. In 1894, German chemist Felix Hoppe-Seyler named the substance chitosan. From 1894 to 1930 there was a period of debate and confusion over the exact composition of chitin and particularly whether animal and fungal forms were the same chemicals. In 1930 the first chitosan films and fibres were patented but competition from petroleum-derived polymers limited their uptake. It was not until the 1970s that there was renewed interest in the compound, spurred partly by laws that prevented the dumping of untreated shellfish waste.

== Manufacture ==
Forming chitosan by partial deacetylation of chitin

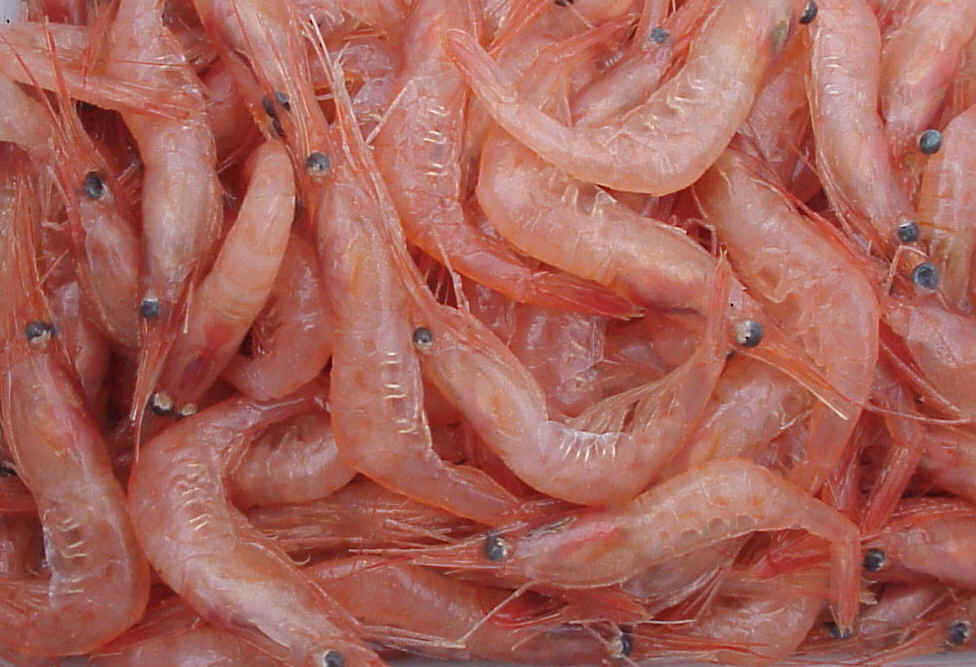
Commercial chitosan is derived from the shells of shrimp and other sea crustaceans, including Pandalus borealis, pictured here.

Chitosan is produced commercially by deacetylation of chitin, which is the structural element in the exoskeleton of crustaceans (such as crabs and shrimp) and cell walls of fungi. A common method for obtaining chitosan is the deacetylation of chitin using sodium hydroxide in excess as a reagent and water as a solvent. The reaction follows first-order kinetics though it occurs in two steps; the activation energy barrier for the first stage is estimated at 48.8 kJ·mol^{−1} at 25–120 °C (77–248 °F) and is higher than the barrier to the second stage.

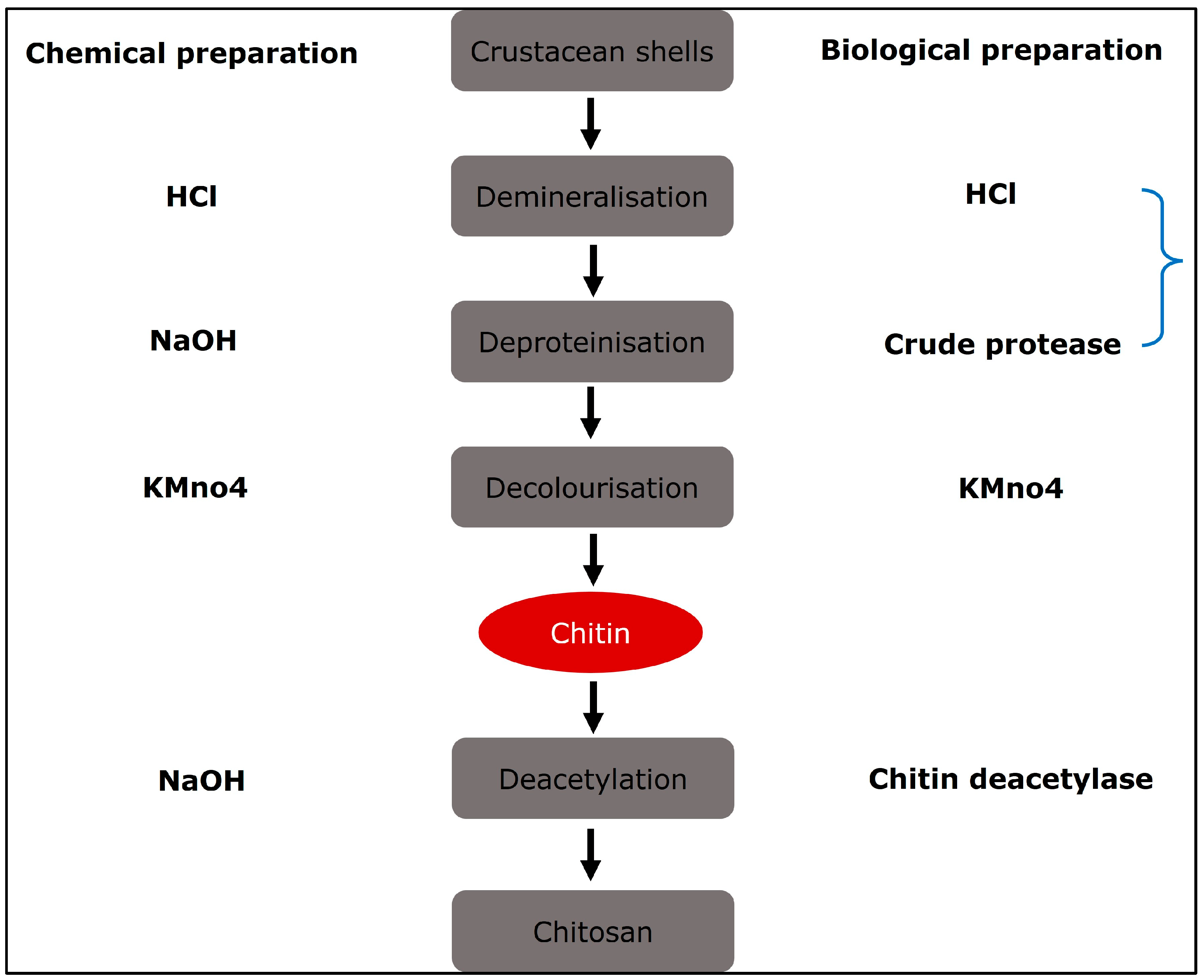
Diagrammatic representation of chitosan preparation from natural source in which natural and chemical processing are utilised.

The degree of deacetylation (DD%) can be determined by NMR spectroscopy and the degree of deacetylation in commercially available chitosan ranges from 60 to 100%. On average, the molecular weight of commercially produced chitosan is 3800–20,000 daltons.

Nanofibrils have been made using chitin and chitosan.

=== Chemical modifications ===
Chitosan contains the following three functional groups: C2-NH_{2}, C3-OH, and C6-OH. C3-OH has a large spatial site resistance and therefore is relatively difficult to modify. C2-NH_{2} is highly reactive for fine modifications and is the most common modifying group in chitosan. In chitosan, although amino groups are more prone to nucleophilic reactions than hydroxyl groups, both can react non-selectively with electrophilic reagents such as acids, chlorides, and haloalkanes to functionalize them. Since chitosan contains a variety of functional groups, it can be functionalized in different ways such as phosphorylation, thiolation, and quaternization to adapt it to specific purposes.

==== Phosphorylated chitosan ====
Water-soluble phosphorylated chitosan can be obtained by the reaction of phosphorus pentoxide and chitosan under low-temperature conditions using methane sulfonic acid as the catalyst; phosphorylated chitosan with good antibacterial activity and ionic properties can be prepared by graft copolymerization of chitosan monophosphate.

The good water solubility and metal chelating properties of phosphorylated chitosan and its derivatives make them widely used in tissue engineering, drug delivery carriers, tissue regeneration, and the food industry.

In tissue engineering, phosphorylated chitosan exhibits improved swelling and ionic conductivity. Although its crystallinity is reduced, its tensile strength remains largely unchanged. These properties make it useful for creating scaffolds that can support bone tissue regeneration by binding growth factors and promoting stem cell differentiation into bone-forming cells. Additionally, to enhance the solubility of chitosan-based hydrogels at neutral or alkaline pH, the derivative N-methylene phosphonic acid chitosan (NMPC-GLU) has been developed. This material maintains good mechanical strength and improve cell proliferation, making it valuable for biomedical applications.

==== Thiolated chitosan ====
Thiolated chitosan is produced by attaching thiol groups to the amino groups of chitosan using a thiol-containing coupling agent. The primary site for this modification is the amino group at the 2nd position of chitosan's glucosamine units. During this process, thioglycolic acid and cysteine mediate the reaction, forming an amide bond between the thiol group and chitosan. At a pH below 5, thiol activity is reduced, which limits disulfide bond formation.

The modified chitosan exhibits improved adhesive properties and stability due to the covalent attachment of the thiol groups. Lower pH reduces oxidation, enhancing its adhesion properties. Additionally, thiolated chitosan can interact with cell membrane receptors, improving membrane permeability and showing potential for applications in bacterial adhesion prevention, for example for coating stainless steel.

==== Ionic chitosan ====
There are two main methods of chitosan quaternization: direct quaternization and indirect quaternization.

- The direct quaternization of chitosan amino acids treats chitosan with haloalkanes under alkaline conditions. Another method is the reaction of chitosan with aldehydes first, followed by reduction, and finally with haloalkanes to obtain quaternized chitosan.
- The indirect quaternization method refers to introducing small molecules containing quaternary ammonium groups into chitosan, such as glycidyl trimethyl ammonium chloride, (5-bromopentyl) trimethyl ammonium bromide, etc. Quaternary ammonium groups can further be introduced into the chitosan backbone via azide-alkyne cycloaddition, or by dissolving chitosan in alkali and urea and then reacting it with 3-chloro-2-hydroxypropyl trimethylammonium chloride, which provides a simple and green solution to achieve chitosan functionalization.

Cationic derivatives of chitosan have important roles in bioadhesion, absorption enhancement, anti-inflammatory, antibacterial and anti-tumor applications. Chitosan modified with quaternary ammonium groups is one of the most common cationic chitosan derivatives. Quaternized chitosan with a permanent positive charge has increased antimicrobial activity and solubility compared to normal chitosan.

== Properties ==
=== Solution ===
Unmodified chitosan is generally insoluble in pure water, but dissolves in dilute acidic solutions (pH < 6). It is insoluble in most organic solvents. This is because chitosan behaves like a strong base, with its primary amine groups having a pK_{a} of about 6.3 for the reaction R-NH^{+}_{3} ⇌ R^{−}NH_{2} + H^{+}. When enough hydrogen ions are present, the amine group becomes protonated, giving it a positive charge. This allows water molecules to better "pick up" chitosan in the form of a water-soluble cationic polyelectrolyte.

Chitosan readily forms soluble salts with many organic acid anions, including formate, acetate, lactate, malate, citrate, glyoxylate, pyruvate, glycolate, and ascorbate. Chitosan can also be dissolved in aqueous CO_{2}, which is useful for minimizing excess acidity.

The solubility and pK_{a} of chitosan is affected by DD%. How the acetyl groups are distributed on the chain also matters. As a polyelectrolyte, the protonation behavior of chitosan is best described by Kachalsky's equation.

=== Gel ===
When an aqueous solution of chitosan is exposed to a basic environment, precipitation occurs to form a gel, specifically an anionic hydrocolloid. However, this "gel" is mechanically weak because there are not a lot of interactions between the chains. Chemicals can be added to encourage ionic, electrostatic, and hydrogen-bonding interactions between chains, making the gel tougher.

The free amine groups on chitosan chains can make crosslinked polymeric networks with dicarboxylic acids to improve chitosan's mechanical properties.

=== Noncovalent interactions ===
As mentioned above, aqueous chitosan has many positively charged amine groups. This makes it readily bind to negatively charged surfaces such as mucosal membranes.

Chitosan can also effectively bind to other surface via hydrophobic interaction and/or cation-π interaction (chitosan as a cation source) in aqueous solution.

=== Biological properties ===
Chitosan is biodegradable and biocompatible.

Chitosan enhances the transport of polar drugs across epithelial surfaces. The enhanced chitosan uptake is mainly due to the interaction of positively charged chitosan with cell membranes, activation of chlorine–bicarbonate exchange channels, and reorganization of proteins associated with epithelial tight junctions, thus opening epithelial tight junctions. However, it is not approved by the FDA for drug delivery. Purified quantities of chitosan are available for biomedical applications.

Chitosan inhibits the growth of different bacteria and fungi by mechanisms involving several factors, including the degree of deacetylation, pH, divalent cations, and solvent type.

== Uses ==
=== Agricultural and horticultural use ===
The agricultural and horticultural uses for chitosan, primarily for plant defense and yield increase, are based on how this glucosamine polymer influences the biochemistry and molecular biology of the plant cell. The cellular targets are the plasma membrane and nuclear chromatin. Subsequent changes occur in cell membranes, chromatin, DNA, calcium, MAP kinase, oxidative burst, reactive oxygen species, callose pathogenesis-related (PR) genes, and phytoalexins.

Chitosan was first registered as an active ingredient (licensed for sale) in 1986.

==== Natural biocontrol and elicitor ====
In agriculture, chitosan is typically used as a natural seed treatment and plant growth enhancer, and as an ecologically friendly biopesticide substance that boosts the innate ability of plants to defend themselves against fungal infections.

Degraded molecules of chitin/chitosan exist in soil and water. Chitosan applications for plants and crops are regulated in the USA by the Environmental Protection Agency, and the USDA National Organic Program regulates its use on organic certified farms and crops. EPA-approved, biodegradable chitosan products are allowed for use outdoors and indoors on plants and crops grown commercially and by consumers.

In the European Union and United Kingdom, chitosan is registered as a "basic substance" for use as a biological fungicide and bactericide on a wide range of crops.

The natural biocontrol ability of chitosan should not be confused with the effects of fertilizers or pesticides upon plants or the environment. Chitosan active biopesticides represent a new tier of cost-effective biological control of crops for agriculture and horticulture. The biocontrol mode of action of chitosan elicits natural innate defense responses within plant to resist insects, pathogens, and soil-borne diseases when applied to foliage or the soil. Chitosan increases photosynthesis, promotes and enhances plant growth, stimulates nutrient uptake, increases germination and sprouting, and boosts plant vigor. When used as a seed treatment or seed coating on cotton, corn, seed potatoes, soybeans, sugar beets, tomatoes, wheat, and many other seeds, it elicits an innate immunity response in developing roots which destroys parasitic cyst nematodes without harming beneficial nematodes and organisms.

Agricultural applications of chitosan can reduce environmental stress due to drought and soil deficiencies, strengthen seed vitality, improve stand quality, increase yields, and reduce fruit decay of vegetables, fruits and citrus crops. Horticultural application of chitosan increases blooms and extends the life of cut flowers and Christmas trees. The US Forest Service has conducted research on chitosan to control pathogens in pine trees and increase resin pitch outflow which resists pine beetle infestation.

Chitosan has been studied for applications in agriculture and horticulture dating back to the 1980s. By 1989, chitosan salt solutions were applied to crops for improved freeze protection or to crop seed for seed priming. Shortly thereafter, chitosan salt received the first ever biopesticide label from the EPA, then followed by other intellectual property applications.

Chitosan has been used to protect plants in space, as well, exemplified by NASA's experiment to protect adzuki beans grown aboard the space shuttle and Mir space station in 1997. NASA results revealed chitosan induces increased growth (biomass) and pathogen resistance due to elevated levels of β-(1→3)-glucanase enzymes within plant cells. NASA confirmed chitosan elicits the same effect in plants on earth.

In 2008, the EPA approved natural broad-spectrum elicitor status for an ultralow molecular active ingredient of 0.25% chitosan. A natural chitosan elicitor solution for agriculture and horticultural uses was granted an amended label for foliar and irrigation applications by the EPA in 2009. Given its low potential for toxicity and abundance in the natural environment, chitosan does not harm people, pets, wildlife, or the environment when used according to label directions. Chitosan blends do not work against bark beetles when put on a tree's leaves or in its soil.

=== Filtration ===
Chitosan can be used in hydrology as a part of a filtration process. Chitosan causes the fine sediment particles to bind together, and is subsequently removed with the sediment during sand filtration. It also removes heavy minerals, dyes, and oils from the water. As an additive in water filtration, chitosan combined with sand filtration removes up to 99% of turbidity. Chitosan is among the biological adsorbents used for heavy metals removal without negative environmental impacts.

Chitosan is used to flocculate algal blooms in ponds and lakes due to the cyanobacteria possessing a negatively-charged cell wall which binds to the cationic chitosan polymer.

In combination with bentonite, gelatin, silica gel, isinglass, or other fining agents, it is used to clarify wine, mead, and beer. Added late in the brewing process, chitosan improves flocculation, and removes yeast cells, fruit particles, and other detritus that cause hazy wine.

=== Winemaking and fungal source chitosan ===
Chitosan has a long history for use as a fining agent in winemaking. Fungal source chitosan has shown an increase in settling activity, reduction of oxidized polyphenolics in juice and wine, chelation and removal of copper (post-racking) and control of the spoilage yeast Brettanomyces. These products and uses are approved for European use by the EU and OIV standards.

=== Wound management ===
Chitosan has the ability to adhere to fibrinogen, which produces increased platelet adhesion, causing clotting of blood and hemostasis. Chitosan may have other properties conducive to wound healing, including antibacterial and antifungal activity, which remain under preliminary research.

==== Wound dressings ====
Chitosan-containing wound dressings have been widely explored for a variety of acute and chronic wounds. Chitosan is used within some wound dressings to decrease bleeding. Upon contact with blood, the bandage becomes sticky, effectively sealing the laceration.

There are many ways to incorporate chitosan into wound dressings:

- Chitosan can be spun directly into a fiber, which can be used to make dressings such as gauze. An example is HemCon OneStop Vascular, approved in the US in 2003.
- Chitosan can be incorporated into ordinary fabrics like gauze, creating chitosan-impregnated gauze which is cheaper than chitosan fiber. Examples include HemCon Guardacare PRO (ChitoGauze, FDA approved 2006), Celox Gauze (FDA approved 2006).
- Chitosan can be incorporated into a hydrogel. Such dressings have also been found useful as burn dressings, and for the treatment of chronic diabetic wounds and hydrofluoric acid burns.

==== Other forms ====
Chitosan can be directly applied to the wound as a hemostatic agent, in granule and powder forms. They are typically salts made from mixing chitosan with an organic acid (such as succinic or lactic acid). One example is Celox granules, US approved 2006.

WoundStat (FDA approved, date unknown) is a granule consisting of chitosan within silica (smectite) and polyacrylic acid. It is a combination of different topical hemostatics, mineral and organic.

=== Temperature-sensitive hydrogels ===
Using glycerolphosphate salts (possessing a single anionic head) without chemical modification or cross-linking, the pH-dependent gelation properties of chitosan (see above) can be converted to temperature-sensitive gelation properties. In the year 2000, Chenite was the first to design the temperature-sensitive chitosan hydrogels drug delivery system using chitosan and β-glycerol phosphate. This new system can remain in the liquid state at room temperature, while becoming gel with increasing temperature above the physiological temperature (37 °C). Phosphate salts cause a particular behaviour in chitosan solutions, thereby allowing these solutions to remain soluble in the physiological pH range (pH 7), and they will be gel only at body temperature. When the liquid solution of chitosan-glycerol phosphate, containing the drug, enters the body through a syringe injection, it becomes a water-insoluble gel at 37 °C. The entrapped drug particles between the hydrogel chains will be gradually released.

=== Research ===
Chitosan and derivatives have been developed for their potential use in nanomaterials, bioadhesives, wound dressing materials, drug delivery systems, enteric coatings, and in medical devices. For example, chitosan nanoparticles produced using sodium tripolyphosphate as crosslinker are stable and biocompatible enough to be used as drug delivery materials.

=== Bioprinting ===
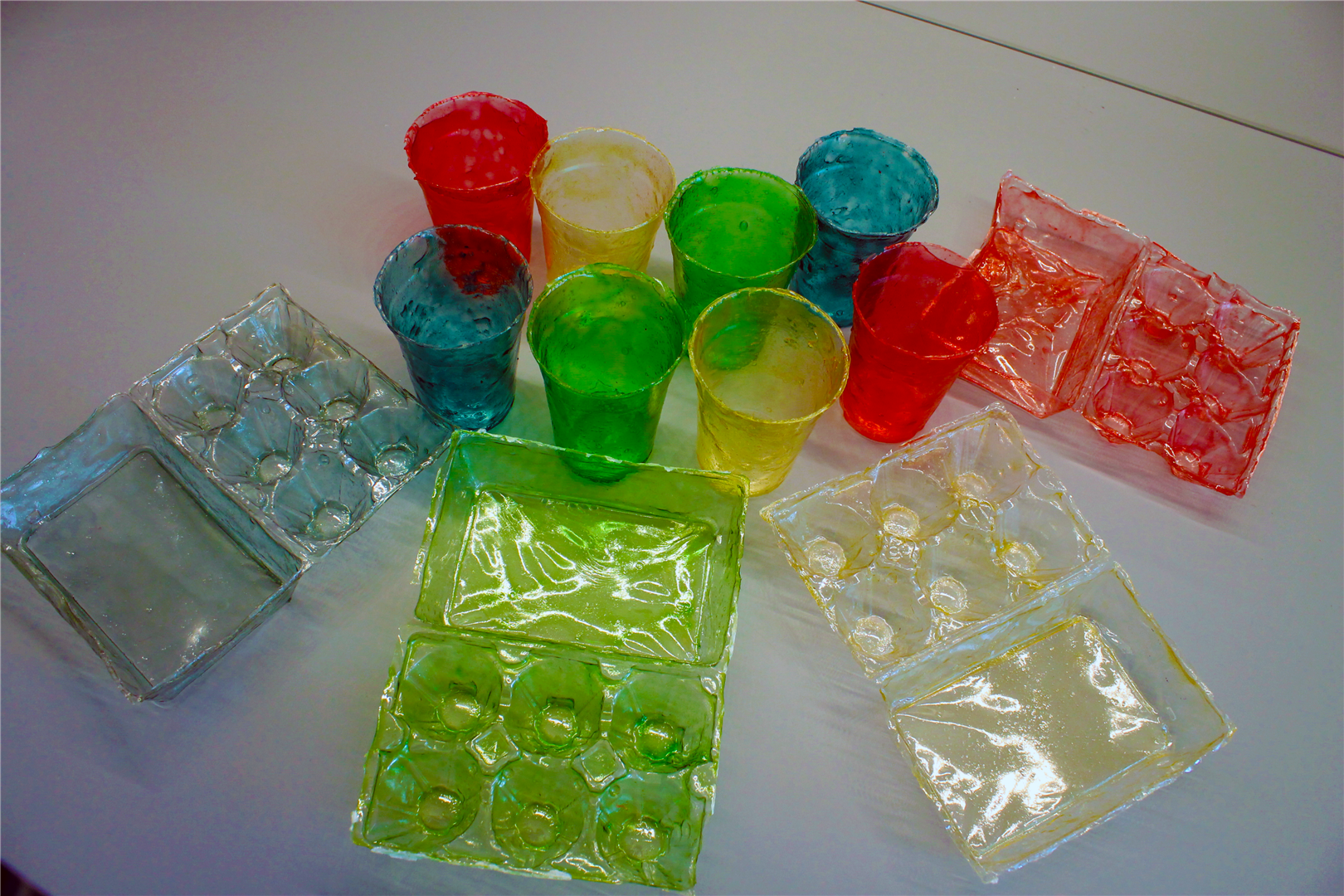
Objects made from chitosan

Bioinspired materials, a manufacturing concept inspired by natural nacre, shrimp carapace, or insect cuticles, has led to development of bioprinting methods to manufacture large scale consumer objects using chitosan. This method is based on replicating the molecular arrangement of chitosan from natural materials into fabrication methods, such as injection molding or mold casting. Once discarded, chitosan-constructed objects are biodegradable and non-toxic. The method is used to engineer and bioprint human organs or tissues.

Pigmented chitosan objects can be recycled, with the option of reintroducing or discarding the dye at each recycling step, enabling reuse of the polymer independently of colorants. Unlike other plant-based bioplastics (e.g. cellulose, starch), the main natural sources of chitosan come from marine environments and do not compete for land or other human resources.

3D bioprinting of tissue engineering scaffolds for creating artificial tissues and organs is another application where chitosan has gained popularity. Chitosan has high biocompatibility, biodegradability, and antimicrobial, hemostatic, wound healing and immunomodulatory activities which make it suitable for making artificial tissues.

=== Weight loss ===
Chitosan is marketed in a tablet form as a "fat binder". Although the effect of chitosan on lowering cholesterol and body weight has been evaluated, the effect appears to have no or low clinical importance. Reviews from 2016 and 2008 found there was no significant effect, and no justification for overweight people to use chitosan supplements. In 2015, the U.S. Food and Drug Administration issued a public advisory about supplement retailers who made exaggerated claims concerning the supposed weight loss benefit of various products.

=== Food packaging ===
A good food packaging material should be able to block out microbes (to prevent spoiling and foodborne illness) and prevent oxygen from entering (to prevent rancidity). Depending on the product, it may be also desirable to stop water vapor from going across (to maintain crispness or wetness), to block out light and ultraviolet, and/or be resistant to rough handling. Classical plastic-based materials satisfy these criteria, but they are not biodegradable and create a trash problem. Among biodegradable options, chitosan films and chitosan composite films come closest to fulfilling all of these goals. Chitosan also has an intrinsic antimicrobial activity, which could potentially provide an extra line of defense to microbes.

=== Battery electrolyte ===
Chitosan is being investigated as an electrolyte for rechargeable batteries with good performance and low environmental impact due to rapid biodegradability, leaving recycleable zinc. The electrolyte has excellent physical stability up to 50 °C, electrochemical stability up to 2 V with zinc electrodes, and accommodates redox reactions involved in the Zn-MnO_{2} alkaline system. As of 2022 results were promising, but the battery needed testing on a larger scale and under actual use conditions.
