= Rouget =

Name

Rouget may refer to:

- Charles Marie Benjamin Rouget (1824-1904), French physiologist
- Claude Joseph Rouget de Lisle (1760-1836), French composer
- Georges Rouget (1781-1869), French painter
- James Rouget (1866-1924), Australian politician
- Jean Rouget (1916-unknown), French field hockey player
- Jean-Claude Rouget (born 1953), French horse trainer and jockey
- Jean-Pierre Rouget (born 1941), French racing driver
- Julio José Iglesias Rouget (born 1972), Spanish footballer

== Other uses ==
- Château Rouget, Bordeaux wine
- Le Rouget, former French commune
- Rouget (grape), another name for the French wine grape Mondeuse Noire
- FV Rouget, a French fishing trawler in service 1948-61
