= Journal of Chemical Crystallography =

- Discipline: Crystallography
- Language: English
- Edited by: W. T. Pennington

Publication details
- History: 1971-1980: Journal of Crystal and Molecular Structure; 1981-1993: Journal of Crystallographic and Spectroscopic Research; 1994-present: Journal of Chemical Crystallography
- Publisher: Springer Science+Business Media
- Frequency: Monthly
- Impact factor: 0.603 (2020)

Standard abbreviations
- ISO 4: J. Chem. Crystallogr.

Indexing
- CODEN: JCCYEV
- ISSN: 1074-1542 (print); 1572-8854 (web)
- LCCN: 94660681
- OCLC no.: 43954962

Links
- Journal homepage; Online access

The Journal of Chemical Crystallography is a peer-reviewed scientific journal publishing original (primary) research and review articles on crystallography and spectroscopy. It is published monthly by Springer Science+Business Media.

The editor-in-chief of Journal of Chemical Crystallography is W.T. Pennington. According to the Journal Citation Reports, the journal has a 2020 impact factor of 0.603.

== Scope ==
The Journal of Chemical Crystallography covers crystal chemistry and physics and their relation to problems of molecular structure; structural studies of solids, liquids, gases, and solutions involving spectroscopic, spectrometric, X-ray, and electron and neutron diffraction; and theoretical studies.

== Abstracting and indexing ==
Journal of Chemical Crystallography is abstracted and indexed in the following databases:

- Chemical Abstracts Service - CASSI
- Science Citation Index - Web of Science
- Scopus
- GeoRef
- EMBiology
