= Crystal chemistry =

Crystal chemistry is the study of the principles of chemistry behind crystals and their use in describing structure-property relations in solids, as well as the chemical properties of periodic structures. The principles that govern the assembly of crystal and glass structures are described, models of many of the technologically important crystal structures (alumina, quartz, perovskite) are studied, and the effect of crystal structure on the various fundamental mechanisms responsible for many physical properties are discussed.

The objectives of the field include:

1. Identifying important raw materials and minerals as well as their names and chemical formulae.
2. Describing the crystal structure of important materials and determining their atomic details.
3. Learning the systematics of crystal and glass chemistry.
4. Understanding how physical and chemical properties are related to crystal structure and microstructure.
5. Studying the engineering significance of these ideas and how they relate to foreign products: past, present, and future.

Topics studied are:

1. Chemical bonding, Electronegativity
2. Fundamentals of crystallography: crystal systems, Miller Indices, symmetry elements, bond lengths and radii, theoretical density
3. Crystal and glass structure prediction: Pauling's and Zachariasen’s rules
4. Phase diagrams and crystal chemistry (including solid solutions)
5. Imperfections (including defect chemistry and line defects)
6. Phase transitions
7. Structure – property relations: Neumann's law, melting point, mechanical properties (hardness, slip, cleavage, elastic moduli), wetting, thermal properties (thermal expansion, specific heat, thermal conductivity), diffusion, ionic conductivity, refractive index, absorption, color, Dielectrics and Ferroelectrics, and Magnetism
8. Crystal structures of representative metals, semiconductors, polymers, and ceramics
