= Curie's principle =

Curie's principle, or Curie's symmetry principle, is a maxim about cause and effect formulated by Pierre Curie in 1894:

the symmetries of the causes are to be found in the effects.

The idea was based on the ideas of Franz Ernst Neumann and Bernhard Minnigerode. Thus, it is sometimes known as the Neumann–Minnigerode–Curie principle.

Later physicists have interpreted Curie's principle in the context of thermodynamics. Dynamics close to equilibrium are described by a set of transport coefficients whose symmetries must match the symmetries of the system, according to Curie's principle.
