= Franz Ernst Neumann =

German physicist and mineralogist (1798–1895)

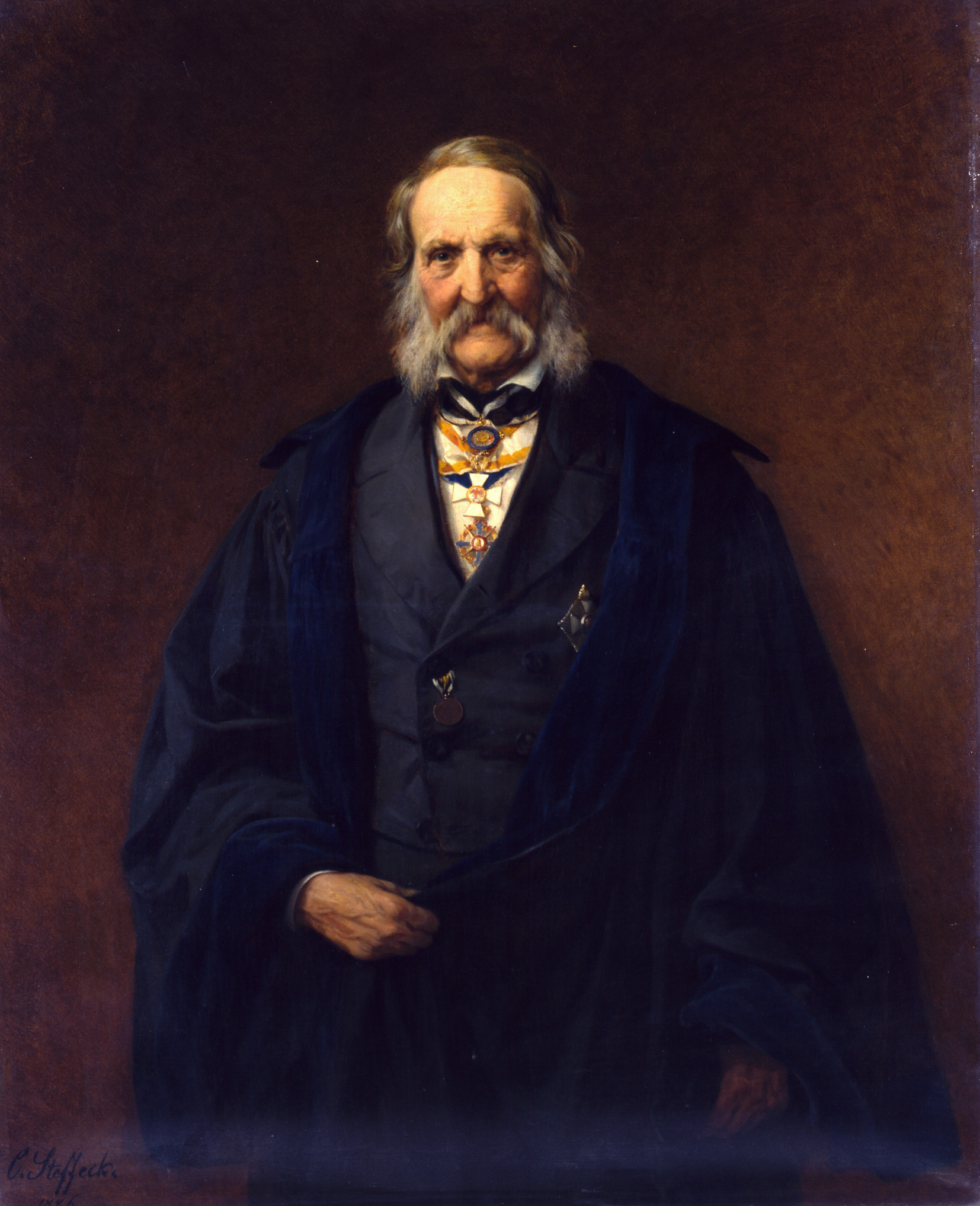
- Portrait by Carl Steffeck (1886)
- Born: 11 September 1798; Joachimsthal, Margraviate of Brandenburg, Kingdom of Prussia, Holy Roman Empire
- Died: 23 May 1895 (aged 96); Königsberg, Kingdom of Prussia, German Empire
- Education: University of Berlin
- Known for: Neumann formula Neumann's law Neumann–Minnigerode-Curie principle Kopp–Neumann law Magnetic vector potential Faraday law of induction
- Children: Carl; Ernst Christian
- Awards: Copley Medal (1886); ForMemRS (1862); Pour le Mérite for Sciences and Arts (1860)
- Scientific career
- Fields: Physics; Mineralogy
- Workplaces: Königsberg University
- Doctoral advisor: Christian Samuel Weiss
- Doctoral students: Woldemar Voigt; Alfred Clebsch; Gustav Robert Kirchhoff; Friedrich Heinrich Albert Wangerin

Franz Ernst Neumann (11 September 1798 – 23 May 1895) was a German mineralogist and physicist. He devised the first formulas to calculate inductance. He also formulated Neumann's law for molecular heat. In electromagnetism, he is credited for introducing the magnetic vector potential. In A Treatise on Electricity and Magnetism of 1873, James Clerk Maxwell attributes the mathematical formulation of Faraday's law of induction to Neumann.

== Biography ==
=== Early life ===
Franz Ernst Neumann was born in Joachimsthal, Margraviate of Brandenburg (near Berlin), the son of Ernst Neumann, a farmer who became a state agent. His mother was a Countess who was not allowed to marry Ernst, and Neumann did not meet her mother until he was 10 years old.

Neumann attended a Gymnasium in Berlin, where he excelled in mathematics. However his studies were interrupted by the war with France. In 1815 he paused his education at Berlin to serve as a volunteer in the Hundred Days against Napoleon, and was wounded in the Battle of Ligny.

He later returned to finish his studies in Berlin. Subsequently, he enrolled at Berlin University in 1818 as a student of theology, but soon turned to scientific subjects.

=== Professional career ===
Neumann's early work was primarily centered around crystallography. His researched gained him recognition, leading to his appointment as Privatdozent at the University of Königsberg. In 1828 he became extraordinary, and in 1829 ordinary, professor of mineralogy and physics. His 1831 study on the specific heats of compounds included what is now known as Neumann's law: the molecular heat of a compound is equal to the sum of the atomic heats of its constituents.

Devoting himself next to optics, he produced memoirs which earned him a high place among early searchers of a true dynamical theory of light. In 1832, by the aid of a particular hypothesis as to the constitution of the ether, he reached by a rigorous dynamical calculation results agreeing with those obtained by Augustin Louis Cauchy, and succeeded in deducing laws of double refraction closely resembling those of Augustin-Jean Fresnel. In studying double refraction, with his deduction of the elastic constants (on which the optical properties depend) Neumann employed the assumption that the symmetry of the elastic behavior of a crystal was equal to that of its form. In other words, he assumed that the magnitudes of the components of a physical property in symmetric positions are equivalent. This assumption substantially reduced the number of independent constants and greatly simplified the elastic equations. However, four decades passed before Neumann elaborated his application of symmetry in a course on elasticity in 1873. This principle was later formalized by his student Woldemar Voigt (1850–1918) in 1885: "the symmetry of the physical phenomenon is at least as high as the crystallographic symmetry", which became a fundamental postulate of crystal physics known as Neumann’s principle. In 1900, Voigt attributed this principle to Neumann's 1832 paper even though, at most, all that was present in that work was an implicit assumption that the symmetry of the phenomenon was equal to that of the crystal. Bernhard Minnigerode (1837–1896), another student of Neumann, first expressed this relation in written form in 1887 in the journal Neues Jahrb. Mineral Geol. Paleontol. (Vol. 5, p. 145).

In 1845, Neumann introduced the magnetic vector potential to discuss Ampère's circuital law. In this work, expanded in 1847, he introduced the first mathematical treatment of Faraday's law of induction.

Later, Neumann attacked the problem of giving mathematical expression to the conditions holding for a surface separating two crystalline media, and worked out from theory the laws of double refraction in strained crystalline bodies. He also made important contributions to the mathematical theory of electrodynamics, and in papers published in 1845 and 1847, established mathematically the laws of the induction of electric currents. His last publication, which appeared in 1878, was on spherical harmonics (Beiträge zur Theorie der Kugelfunctionen).

With the mathematician Carl Gustav Jacobi, he founded in 1834 the Mathematisch-physikalisches Seminar which operated in two sections for mathematics and for mathematical physics. Not every student took both sections. In his section on mathematical physics Neumann taught mathematical methods as well as the techniques of an exact experimental physics grounded in the type of precision measurement perfected by his astronomer colleague Friedrich Wilhelm Bessel. The objective of his seminar exercises was to perfect one's ability to practice an exact experimental physics through the control of both constant and random experimental errors. Only a few students actually produced original research in the seminar; a notable exception was Gustav Robert Kirchhoff who formulated Kirchhoff's laws on the basis of his seminar research. This seminar was the model for many others of the same type established after 1834, including Kirchhoff's own at Heidelberg University.

Neumann retired from his professorship in 1876, and died at Königsberg (now Kaliningrad, Russia) in 1895 at the age of 96.

== Children ==
Neumann had four children with his wife Luise Florentine Hagen (born 1800): Carl Gottfried Neumann (1832–1925), Franz Ernst Christian Neumann (1834–1918), Friedrich Julius Neumann (1835-1910), and Luise Neumann (1837-1934). His son Carl, became a mathematician and physicist; his younger son, Ernst became professor of medicine in Königsberg.

== Works ==
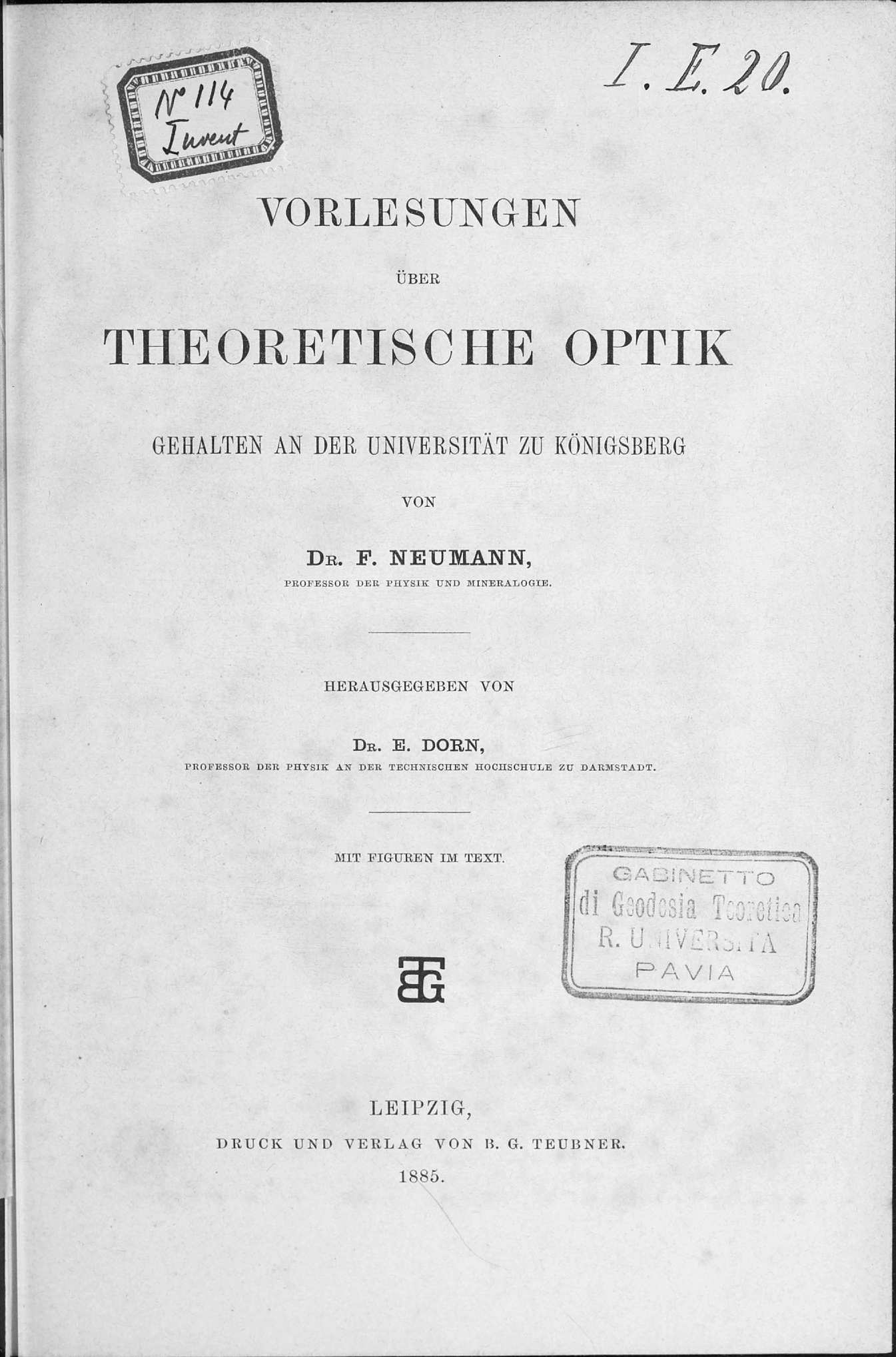
"Vorlesungen über theoretische Optik", 1885

- Beiträge zur Krystallonomie (Mittler, Berlin, 1823)
- Beiträge zur Theorie der Kugelfunctionen (B. G. Teubner, Leipzig, 1878)
- Vorlesungen über die Theorie des Magnetismus (in German). Leipzig: Benedictus Gotthelf Teubner. 1881.
- Einleitung in die theoretische Physik (in German). Leipzig: Benedictus Gotthelf Teubner. 1883.
- Vorlesungen über die Theorie der Elasticität der festen Körper und des Lichtäthers (in German). Leipzig: Benedictus Gotthelf Teubner. 1885.
- Vorlesungen über theoretische Optik (in German). Leipzig: Benedictus Gotthelf Teubner. 1885.
- Franz Neumanns Gesammelte werke (2 vols.) (B. C. Teubner, Leipzig, 1906–1928)

== See also ==
- Chemical crystallography before X-rays
- Faraday's law of induction
- Plane of vibration
- International System of Electrical and Magnetic Units
- Physical crystallography before X-rays
