= Bernhard Minnigerode =

German mathematician, mineralogist and Alpine climber

- Born: 10 August 1837; Darmstadt
- Died: 15 August 1896 (aged 59); Špindlerův Mlýn
- Education: University of Göttingen
- Known for: Neumann–Minnigerode–Curie principle
- Scientific career
- Fields: Mathematics, mineralogy
- Workplaces: University of Greifswald
- Thesis: Über Wärmeleitung in Krystallen (On heat conduction in crystals) (1862)
- Academic advisors: Franz Ernst Neumann

Bernhard Minnigerode (10 August 1837 – 15 August 1896) was a German mathematician, mineralogist and Alpine climber. His name, together with Franz Ernst Neumann, is associated with Curie's principle which is also named the Neumann–Minnigerode–Curie principle.

== Career ==
Minnigerode was born on 10 August 1837 in Darmstadt. Minnigerode was a student of Neumann at the University of Göttingen and gained his PhD with a study of heat conduction in crystals in 1862. Subsequently he moved to the University of Greifswald and was appointed an associate professor of mathematics in 1874 and a full professor in 1885. Minnigerode's work spanned mathematics, physics, mineralogy and crystallography.

In 1884 Minnigerode studied the derivation of the elastic constants of crystals, and stated the general relation between the physical characteristics and the symmetry of crystals: "Physically speaking, crystals have all the symmetrical properties of their form; some of the physical properties, however, have still higher symmetry."

In the same three-part paper Minnigerode also derived the 32 crystal classes (point groups) using group theory and stated "The symmetry group of a crystal is a subgroup of the symmetry groups of all the physical phenomena which may possibly occur in that crystal." However, in a letter to Arthur Moritz Schoenflies dated 21 October 1890, Evgraf Fedorov claimed that the credit for discovering the 32 crystal classes should go to his countryman Axel Gadolin and not to Minnigerode. Gadolin's method was based on stereographic projection rather than group theory, and it was not until the work of Andreas Speiser in the 1920s that it was recognised that it is exactly the group properties that make symmetry significant for crystals.

In 1886 Minnigerode extended his symmetry method from elasticity to thermal conduction in crystals. According to Shaul Katzir, a historian of science, "This was the earliest application of a rigorous argument of symmetry in physics beyond elasticity." In 1887 Minnigerode published the first written statement of the Neumann–Minnigerode–Curie symmetry principle. A later reviewer commented on Minnigerode's paper: "His discussion, while highly mathematical, is elegant and brief."

In the 1880s Arthur Moritz Schoenflies was using group theory in his studies of crystallographic space groups. His derivation of the 230 space groups was published in 1894 and tended to obscure Minnigerode's earlier contributions.

Minnigerode died in Špindlerův Mlýn in the area of the Giant Mountains on 15 August 1896.

== Publications ==
- 1862: PhD thesis: Über Wärmeleitung in Krystallen [On heat conduction in crystals]
- 1873: Paper introducing the nearest integer algorithm using continued fractions
- 1873: Paper on quadratic forms with complex coefficients
- 1884: Derivation of the 32 crystal classes using group theory part II part III
- 1886: Paper on heat conduction in crystals making use of symmetry considerations
- 1887: Paper in which the Neumann–Minnigerode–Curie principle is formally stated

== Alpine climber ==
Minnigerode was an Alpine climber and a member of the Basel section of the Swiss Alpine Club. One of the couloirs on the East face of the Ortler was named after Minnigerode following his first attempted climb in 1878. For further details of Minnigerode's climbing achievements see it:Bernhard Minnigerode.

== Honours ==
Minnigerode was elected as a corresponding member of the mathematical class of the Göttingen Academy of Sciences and Humanities in 1874.

== See also ==
- Physical crystallography before X-rays
