= Congenital epulis =

- Other names: Congenital gingival cell tumor, Neumann's tumour
- Specialty: Oncology, oral and maxillofacial surgery

Congenital epulis, also known as congenital granular cell tumour, is a benign rare tumour of the oral cavity of newborn infants. The initial first description of the lesion was dated in 1871 by Dr. Franz Ernst Christian Neumann, who coined the name for the tumour, known as Neumann's tumour. The term 'epulis' which has been used in the condition, simply refers to swelling of the gingiva, also known as gums. It may lead to mechanical obstruction and blocking of the airways, resulting in problems like respiratory distress and feeding difficulties. Such cases require immediate surgical intervention as they interfere with feeding and have the potential to cause death via lack of oxygen, and asphyxia during the perinatal and postnatal period.

Congenital epulis has an extremely low incidence of roughly 0.0006% and more than 250 cases have been described in the literature so far. The alveolar ridges of the maxilla and mandible are the most frequent sites, while occurrence on the tongue is rare. This tumour has a strong tendency for occurrence in females, which suggests hormonal involvement during embryonic development. The lesion is 3 times more frequently seen in the maxilla than in the mandible and the female: male ratio is 10:1.

The origin of congenital epulis remains unclear. Several theories have been proposed, suggesting it may arise from: (1) the same tissue that forms teeth, (2) the early structure of teeth, known as dental papilla, (3) a developmental abnormality in tooth formation, (4) a connection to a rare tumor called granular cell ameloblastoma, or (5) a similarity to another poorly understood condition called granular cell myoblastoma. A study conducted in 1970 using electron microscopy on congenital epulis and observed specialized connections between some of the granular cells. This finding hints that these cells might originate from epithelial tissue. However, their research did not provide definitive conclusions.

== Pathogenesis ==
Congenital epulis is frequently seen in females; the female-to-male ratio has been reported to be between 9:1 and 10:1. It has been suggested that endogenous hormonal influences, such as those produced by the mother or foetus during pregnancy, are the source of this gender bias. However, the existence of progesterone and estrogen receptors within the lesion has not corroborated this idea. An intrauterine stimulation from the foetal ovaries could be another reason for the female preponderance.

The pathophysiology of congenital epulis has been explained by several ideas. According to one such idea, some tumours have been demonstrated to spontaneously regress, and the tumor's growth ceases after delivery. This lends credence to the theory that hormones from the mother or foetus may influence its growth. Although it is still ambiguous, this lends credence to the theory that foetal or maternal hormones may contribute to its development. Furthermore, congenital epulis may have a mesenchymal origin, as indicated by ultrastructural and immunohistochemical results in documented cases, where the cells display characteristics of fibroblasts and histiocytes.

== Clinical Features ==
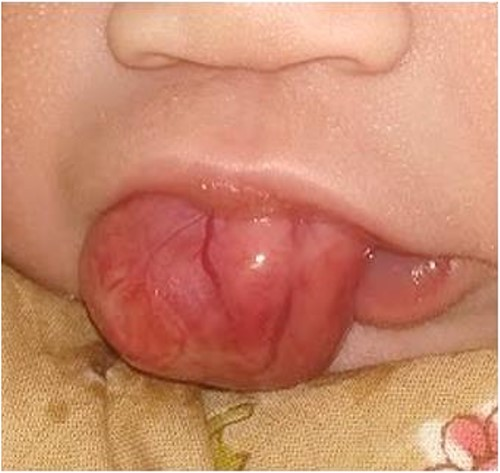
A preoperative clinical image showing an epulis mass extending into the oral cavity.

Depending on the size, number, and location of the tumor, clinical manifestation could vary from no symptoms to feeding difficulty and rarely airway obstruction. Clinically, congenital epulis can grossly present as a smooth-surfaced lobular or ovoid, sessile or pedunculated, red or pink nodule with a size ranging from several millimeters up to 7.5–10 cm and firm consistency.

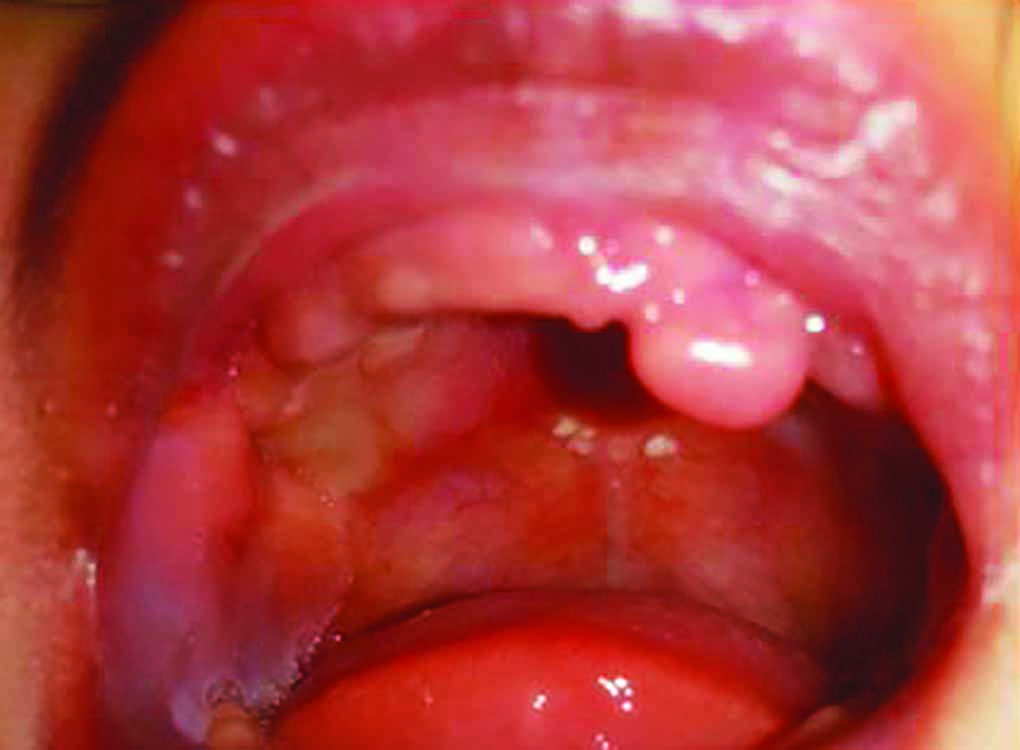
Appearance of an intra oral mass arising from gingiva of the anterior maxilla.

Congenital Epulis is most commonly seen in neonates, with a mass developing from the gingiva and spreading over the maxillary alveolar ridge, generally near the lateral incisors or canine region. It usually tends to grow on the anterior alveolar ridge of newborns, more on the maxilla than on the mandible with a ratio of 3:1. However, there are a few cases reported in other sites in the oral cavity, such as the tongue.

The lesions occur sporadically, and no familial predispositions are noted. Usually, congenital epulis is unveiled as a solitary lesion. Although, multiple lesions were noted in 10% of documented cases of congenital epulis in a Medline search.

== Histopathological Characteristics ==
Histopathologically, congenital epulis is usually characterized by the presence of big, rounded cells that fill the mucosa's lamina propria and have round to oval nuclei and an abundance of eosinophilic cytoplasm. A thin layer of connective tissue separated the surface layer of cells from the growing new cells. Numerous histological traits, such as a fibrous and granulomatous appearance, have been reported in recent research.

The most common theory about how these lesions form is that they come from early-stage connective tissue cells that change due to external factors affecting their genes.

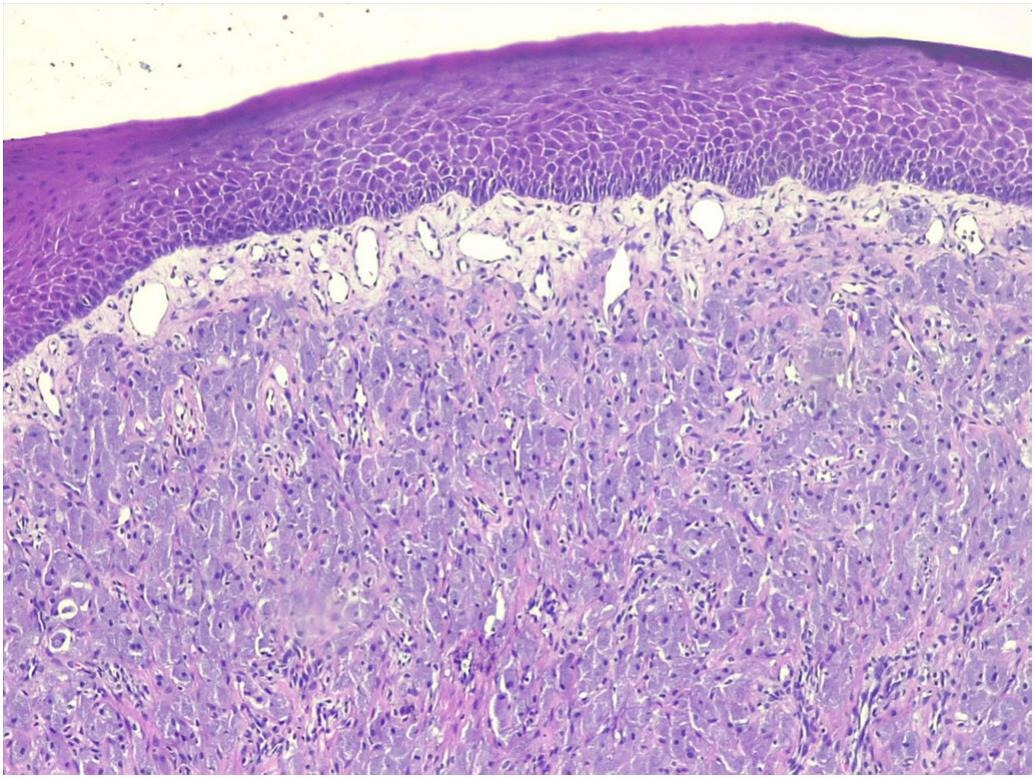
A low-power microscopic image reveals stratified squamous epithelium with a subepithelial proliferation of large polygonal cells arranged in nests and dense sheet

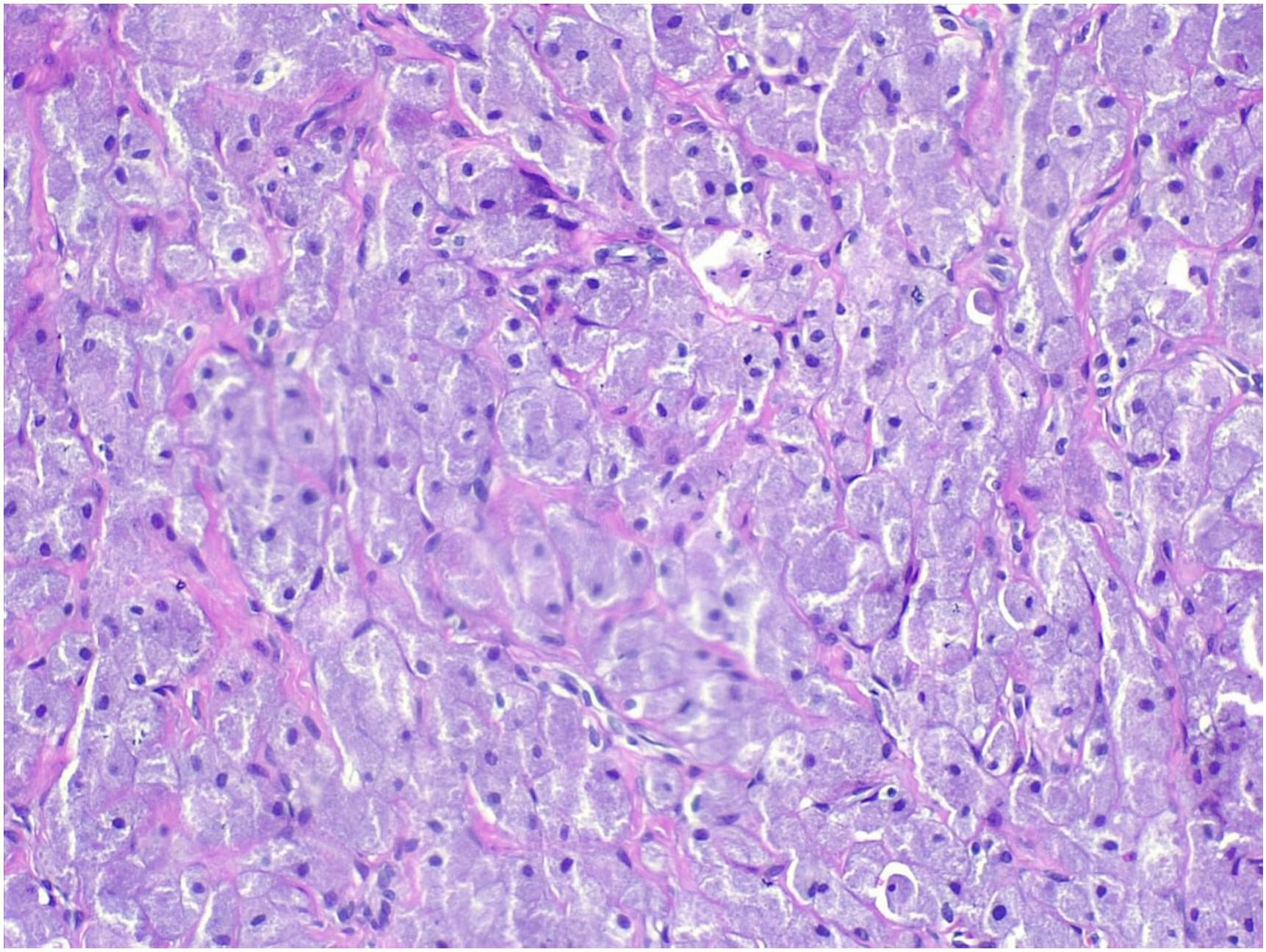
A medium-power microscopic view displays nests and sheets of large polygonal cells with abundant granular eosinophilic cytoplasm and a centrally located nucleus

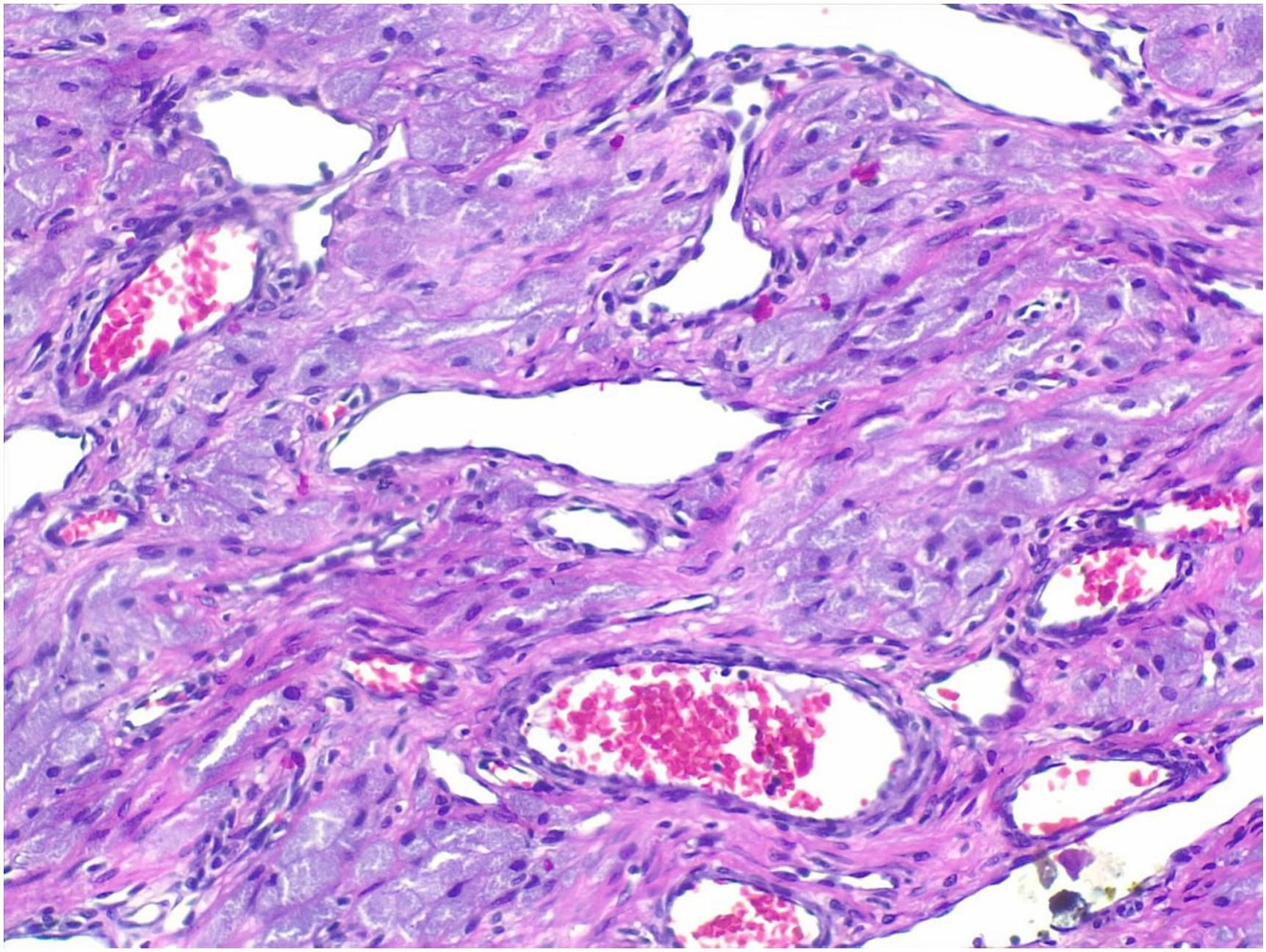
A high-power microscopic view reveals variably sized blood vessels scattered throughout certain areas of the lesion

== Diagnosis ==
=== Diagnosis ===
Prenatal Diagnosis

Congenital epulis can be identified prenatally through ultrasound and magnetic resonance imaging (MRI), particularly during the third trimester of pregnancy. Prenatal ultrasound may reveal a well-defined mass arising from the gingival tissue of the fetus, while MRI provides detailed soft tissue contrast, aiding in characterization, localization, and differentiation from other orofacial anomalies. However, prenatal diagnosis of congenital epulis is rare, as it develops slowly during the third trimester of pregnancy.

Histopathological Diagnosis

Definitive diagnosis is established through histopathological examination of the excised lesion.

Microscopically, congenital epulis is composed of:

- Sheets of proliferating polygonal to round cells with overlying thin squamous, eosinophilic, granular cytoplasm
- Centrally located, round nuclei

These histopathological features are essential in distinguishing congenital epulis from other gingival and soft tissue neoplasms.

Immunohistochemical Analysis

Immunohistochemical staining serves as an important adjunct in the differential diagnosis of congenital epulis. A key feature of congenital epulis is its lack of reaction to the S-100 protein test, which is typically positive in other similar tumors. When doctors examine the tissue using an S-100 stain, congenital epulis does not show a response, unlike other granular cell tumors. This distinction helps confirm the diagnosis and differentiates congenital epulis from other oral tumors in newborns.

== Possible Differential Diagnosis ==
=== Differential Diagnosis of Congenital Epulis ===
Congenital epulis, also known as congenital granular cell epulis, is a rare benign tumor of the gingiva in newborns. Clinically, it presents as a pedunculated or sessile mass protruding through the oral cavity of a newborn child. Due to its clinical presentation as a soft tissue mass in the oral cavity, it must be differentiated from several other neonatal oral lesions. Diagnosis is primarily based on clinical examination, imaging, and histopathological evaluation.

==== Rhabdomyosarcoma ====
Rhabdomyosarcoma is a rare malignant tumor in neonates that can occasionally involve the oral cavity. Unlike congenital epulis, rhabdomyosarcoma typically exhibits infiltrative growth, aggressive behavior, and malignant histological features, necessitating early detection and intervention.

==== Infantile Myofibroma ====
Infantile myofibroma is a benign fibrous tumor that may present as a gingival mass in newborns. However, histologically, it is composed of fibrous tissue rather than granular cells, distinguishing it from congenital epulis.

==== Melanotic Neuroectodermal Tumor of Infancy (MNTI) ====
Melanotic neuroectodermal tumor of infancy is a rare, benign neoplasm characterized by painless, non-ulcerative, expansile, and rapidly growing pigmented lesions. The presence of pigmentation and neuroectodermal differentiation differentiates it from congenital epulis.

==== Peripheral Odontogenic Fibroma ====
Peripheral odontogenic fibroma is a benign odontogenic tumor that appears as a firm, well-defined mass on the gingiva. Its gingival location may resemble congenital epulis, but histopathological examination reveals odontogenic epithelial components, which are absent in congenital epulis.

==== Neurofibroma ====
Neurofibroma is a benign nerve sheath tumor that may present as a soft tissue swelling in the oral cavity, including the gingiva. In neonates, a neurofibroma may clinically mimic congenital epulis, particularly if the lesion is small and non-infiltrative. Immunohistochemical staining for S-100 protein, which is positive in neurofibromas but negative in congenital epulis, serves as a distinguishing factor.

==== Teratoma ====
Oral teratomas present as congenital masses with potential mass effect, for example poor feeding and breathing difficulty. Some cases may have an intracranial component, necessitating further imaging and surgical intervention.

==== Eruption Cyst ====
Eruption cysts present as bluish, dome-shaped, translucent, and compressible swellings within the oral mucosa, typically overlying an erupting primary tooth. Their characteristic association with erupting teeth distinguishes them from congenital epulis.

Differentiating congenital epulis and these conditions is essential for accurate diagnosis and appropriate management. Histopathological evaluation, along with immunohistochemical staining, plays a crucial role in distinguishing congenital epulis from other similar lesions.

== Complications ==
Clinical complications of congenital epulis can range from no complications to feeding difficulties and, in rare cases, airway obstruction if the tumor is large. The complications listed below are more commonly associated with large congenital epulis tumors.

Congenital epulis is one of the extrinsic factors in the oral region that can cause airway obstruction, leading to dyspnea (shortness of breath). If a newborn has a compromised airway at birth, the inability to secure the airway promptly may result in hypoxic cerebral insult - in which the brain does not receive enough oxygen - or death. Fetal ultrasound and magnetic resonance imaging can help differentiate between intrinsic and extrinsic airway obstruction, allowing for optimal delivery planning and management. For instance, collaboration with ear, nose, and throat (ENT) specialists or pediatric surgery airway teams may be necessary in case of an emergency resection or tracheostomy in the newborn. Congenital epulis, however, may complicate general anesthesia by interfering with endotracheal intubation. The vascular and friable nature of the mass increases the risk of significant bleeding, further obscuring visualization of the vocal cords during intubation. In addition to oral airway obstruction, extrinsic airway obstructions may also occur at the cervical or thoracic levels. Examples include cervical teratomas, epignathus, cervical lymphangiomas, and micrognathia.

Beyond respiratory issues, large congenital epulis tumors may also interfere with feeding or prevent proper closure of the mouth, leading to impaired swallowing of amniotic fluid and resulting in polyhydramnios.

Other common clinical manifestations include cyanosis, coughing, and, occasionally, vomiting.

Key Points:

- Airway obstruction
- Feeding problems
- Vomiting
- Dyspnea
- Coughing
- Polyhydramnios
- Complicate general anesthesia by interfering with endotracheal intubation
- Hypoxic cerebral insult
- Cyanosis
- Death

== Treatment and Management ==
Recommended management for epulis is surgical excision

Exceptions in cases:

Size: Larger congenital epulis are more likely to obstruct the airway, so surgery is recommended.

Feeding: In cases where congenital epulis is causing feeding difficulties, surgery is also recommended.

Spontaneous regression: Small congenital epulis that are not causing feeding or airway problems may be managed conservatively, as they often stop growing after birth and may regress on their own.

Incomplete excision: In case where the Congenital Epulis is not completely removed, the recurrence rate is almost 0%.

Other considerations for treating Congenital Epulis include:

- Perioperative care: Close coordination between a pediatric plastic surgeon and a pediatric anesthesiologist is important.
- Follow-up: After surgical removal, it's important to follow up to check for recurrence.
- Prenatal diagnosis: Fetal MRI and 3-dimensional ultrasound can help diagnose CE before birth.
