= Leukopoiesis =

Formation of white blood cells

Leukopoiesis is a form of hematopoiesis in which white blood cells (WBCs, or leukocytes) are formed in bone marrow located in bones in adults and hematopoietic organs in the fetus. White blood cells, indeed all blood cells, are formed from the differentiation of pluripotent hematopoietic stem cells, which give rise to several cell lines with unlimited differentiation potential. These immediate cell lines, or colonies, are progenitors of red blood cells (erythrocytes), platelets (megakaryocytes), and the two main groups of WBCs, myelocytes and lymphocytes.

== See also ==
- Lymphopoiesis
- Myelopoiesis
