= Neumann's law =

Law of chemistry

Neumann's law states that the molecular heat in compounds of analogous constitution is always the same. It is named after German mineralogist and physicist Franz Ernst Neumann, who extended the law of the heat of elements by stating that the molecular heat is equal to the sum of the heat of each constituent atom.
