= Charles Marie Benjamin Rouget =

French physiologist

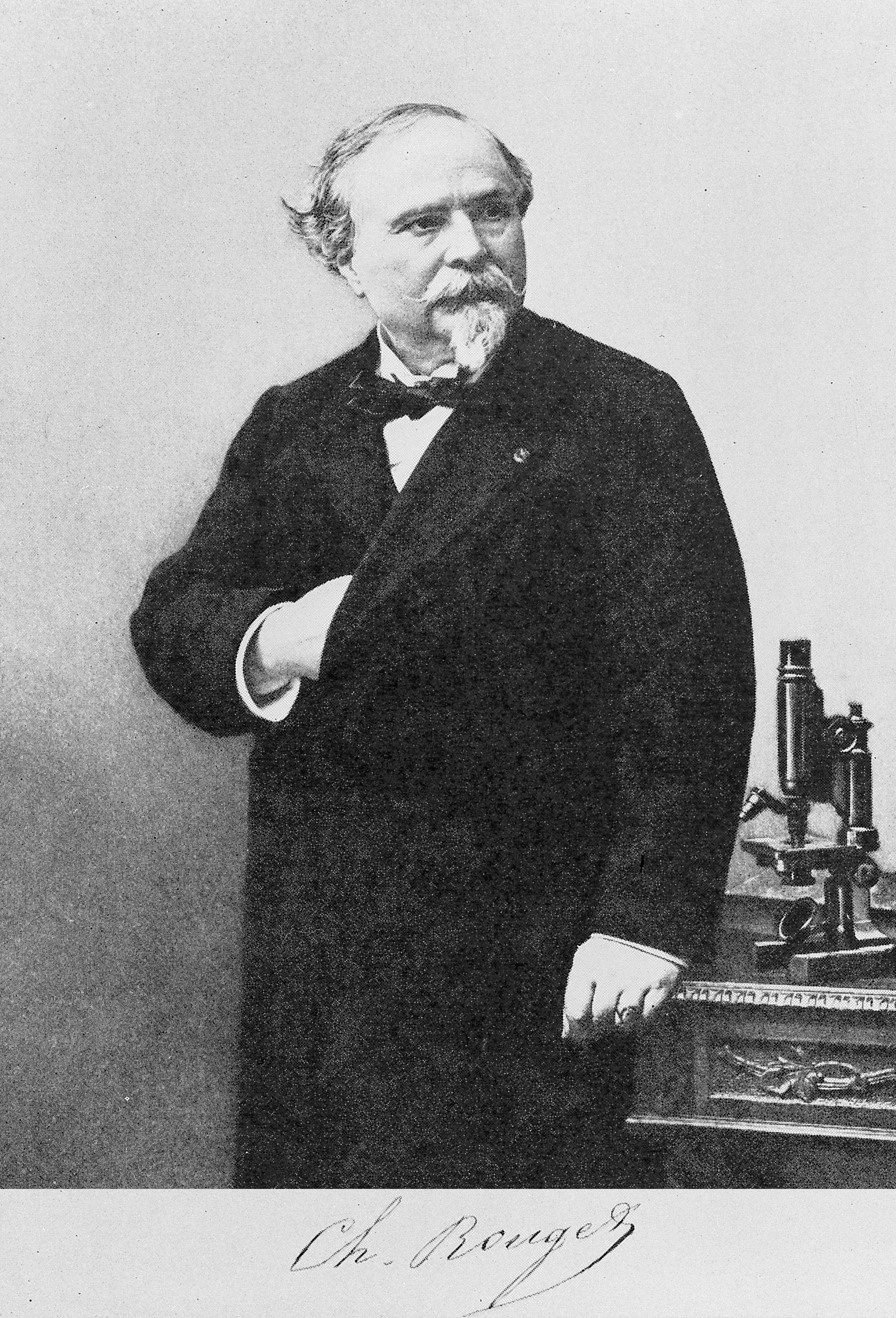
Charles Marie Benjamin Rouget

Charles Marie Benjamin Rouget (19 August 1824 – 1904, Paris) was a French physiologist born in Gisors, Eure. He studied at the Collège Sainte-Barbe with medical training at hospitals in Paris. He was later a professor of physiology at the University of Montpellier (1860). From 1879 to 1893, he was a professor of physiology at the Muséum d’Histoire Naturelle in Paris.

Rouget is largely remembered for his correlation of physiology to microscopic anatomical structure. He was the first to discover the branching contractile cells on the external wall of the capillaries in amphibians, structures that are now known as "Rouget cells". Also the eponymous "Rouget's muscle" was described by him, which are circular fibers of the ciliary muscle of the eye. These fibers are sometimes called "Müller's muscle" after German anatomist Heinrich Müller (1820–1864).
