= Crozant School =

William Didier-Pouget, ca. 1902-1903, Hauts Plateaux de la Corrèze (Bruyères en fleurs), oil on canvas, 47.5 x 83.5 cm. (18 3/4 x 32 3/4 in.)

The Crozant School (French: École de Crozant) is named after Crozant, a Commune of France at the northern limit of the department of Creuse. It consists of a host of landscape painters who worked from 1830 to 1950 on the banks of the Grande Creuse, Petite Creuse, Sédelle and Gargilesse rivers near the communes of Crozant and Fresselines.

The "Crozant School" is simply a convenient name to designate all those who have found inspiration in the Creuse valleys: it is a "school without a master". In little more than a century, nearly 500 painters frequented the region.

== History ==
=== Abandonment of neoclassical ===
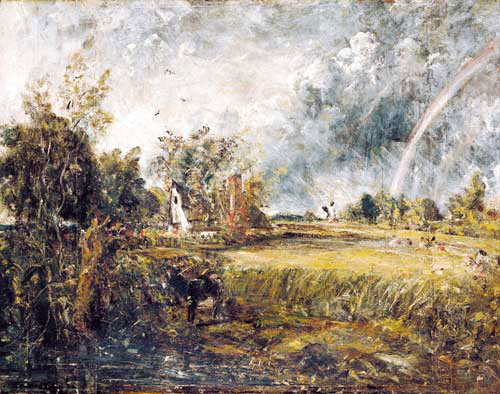
Cottage at East Bergholt by John Constable

At the start of the 19th century, artistic fashion had settled around the neoclassical tradition as exemplified by the work of the painter Jacques-Louis David. Alongside this academicism, the romantic tradition formalized by Gericault, Bonington and Delacroix was gaining momentum.

In 1824 the Salon of 1824 in Paris exhibited some of the works of John Constable. His rural scenes had a decisive influence on younger artists, leading them to abandon the formalism of the time and take their inspiration from Nature. They produced paintings, often of rural scenes, that broke from the dramatic mythological themes.

During the 1848 revolution, the painters that would soon be associated with Crozant school or the Barbizon School got together and deliberately opted to follow Constable's precepts, to make nature itself the subject of their paintings. Among them, Millet spread his vision of landscapes with figures, depicting peasants and farm work. The Gleaners (1857) is a perfect example, showing three peasant busy gleaning after the harvest, without staging or dramatic effects but simply an evocation of the simple life.

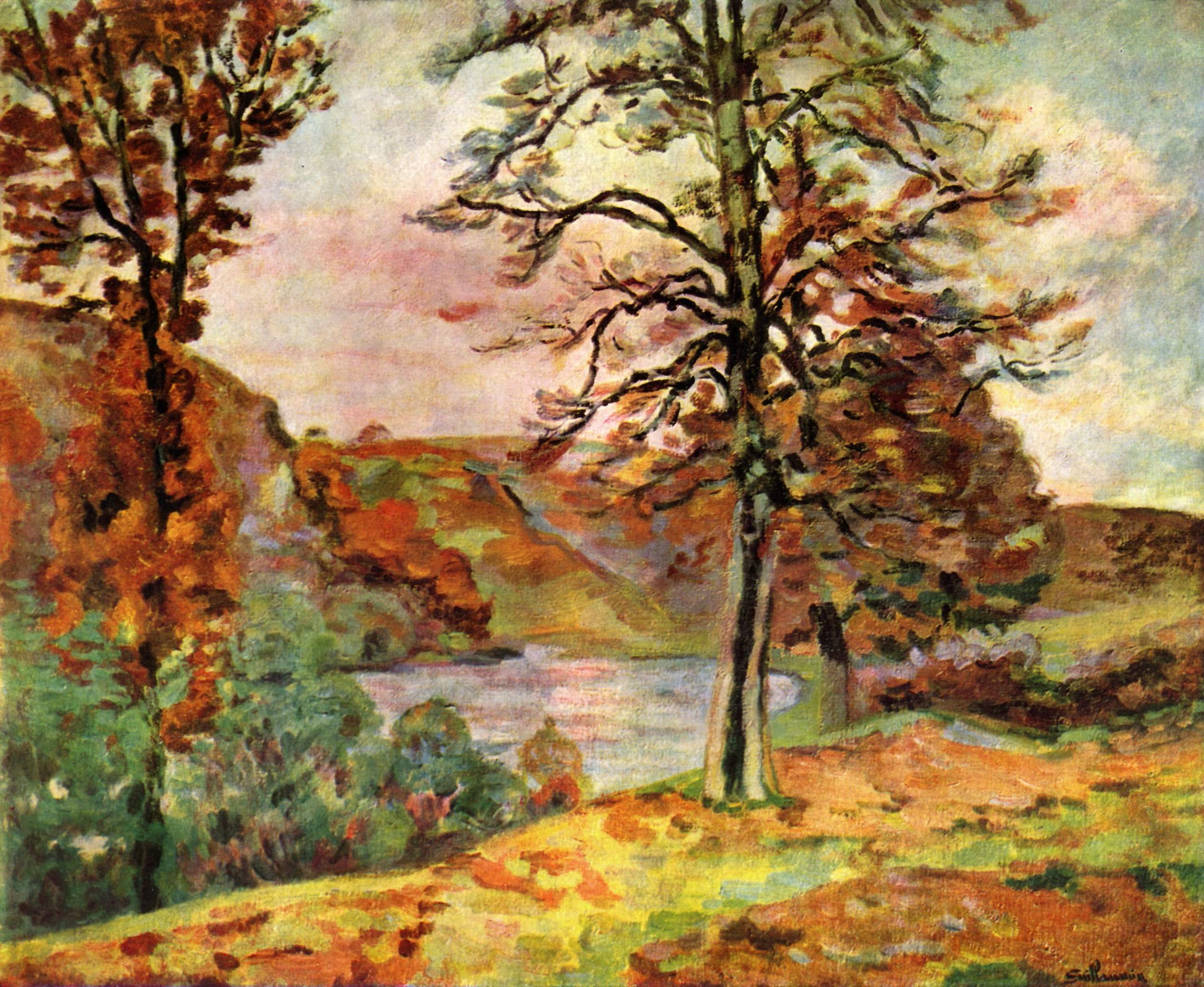
Creuze landscape by Jean-Baptiste Armand Guillaumin

=== Origin of Crozant ===
Fresselines is located about fifty kilometers from Nohant, the home of George Sand (1804-1876). She and her prestigious guests enjoyed walks in the Creuze valleys around Fresselines and Crozant. She would evoke Crozant or Fresselines in several of her novels: Lettres d'un voyageur (Letters of a traveler), Le péché de Monsieur Antoine (the Sin of Monsieur Antoine) and Jeanne. In 1857 George Sand's friend Alexandre Manceau offered her a small house in Dampierre-Gargilesse ten kilometers from Crozant. She was to spend several visits there. The fame of Crozant and its surroundings attracted many artists.

== School without a master ==
The term "Crozant School" appeared as early as 1864, during the Exposition des beaux-arts, Salon of 1864 (Palais des Champs-Elysées). Since then, many artists have transited through the Valley of the Creuse and especially through Crozant, Fresselines and Gargilesse. The term is a generic since no teacher ever taught in the Creuse valleys.

Similarly, it was not until 1890 that the term "Barbizon School" appeared in the work of Scottish art critic David Croal Thomson entitled: The Barbizon School of Painters. Art historians have disputed the idea that there was ever a "school" at Barbizon. (Note: This is the view taken by Chantal Georgel in the exhibition "The Forest of Fontainebleau, a great natural studio" at the Musée d'Orsay in 2007)

The Barbizan school is a set of artists with very different styles who at very different times found inspiration in the Forest of Fontainebleau.

== Artists of the Crozant School ==
=== Painters ===
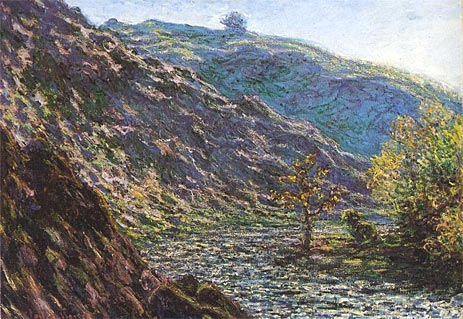
La Petite Creuse by Claude Monet, 1889

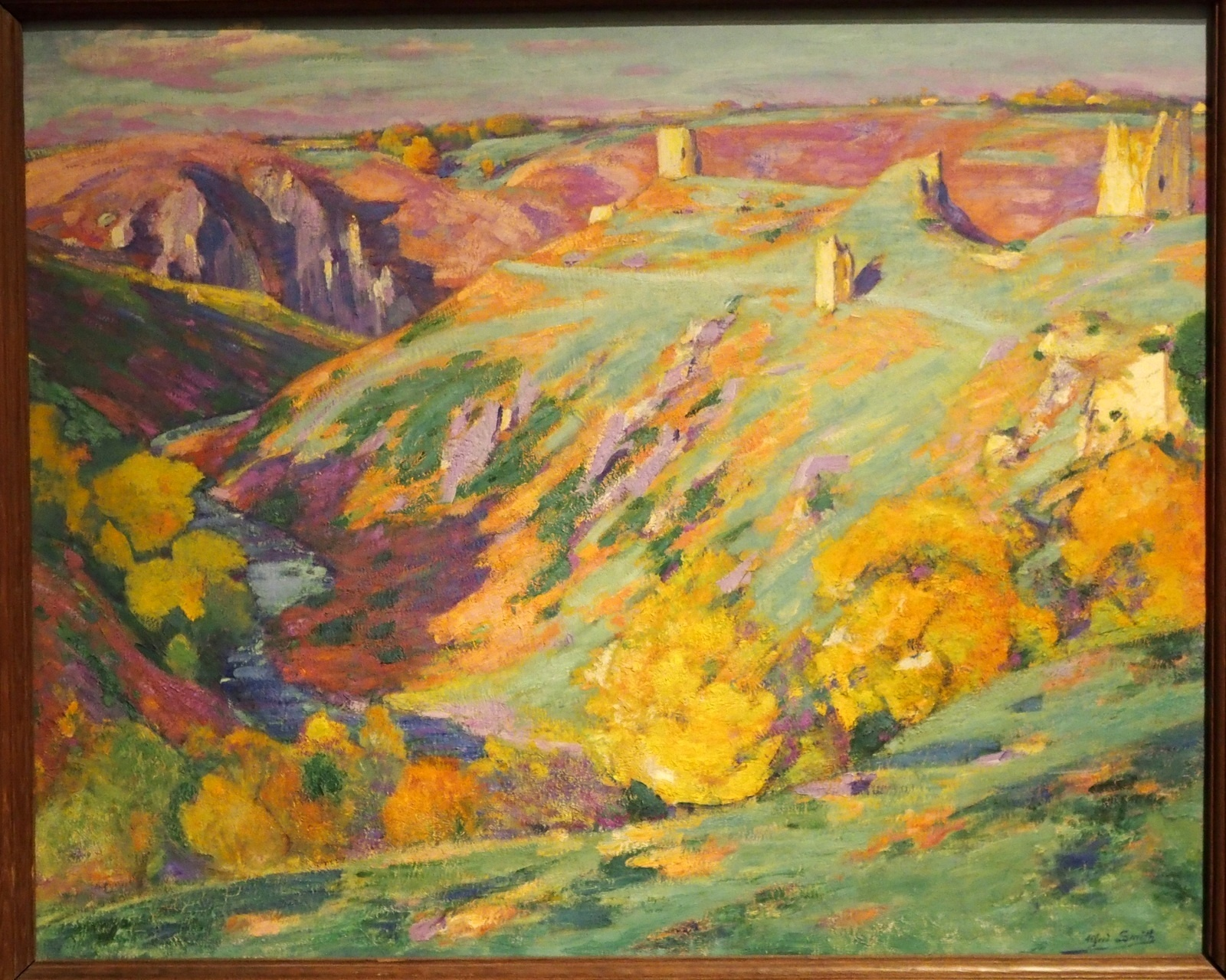
Crozant La Sédelle en octobre by Alfred Smith, c. 1923

- Jules Dupré (1811-1889)
- Armand Cassagne (1823-1907)
- Claude Monet (1840-1926) visited Fresselines from March to May 1889, where he painted a series on the site of the confluence of the two rivers. He created 23 paintings in the Valley.
- Father Laurent Guétal (1841-1892).
- Armand Guillaumin (1841-1927), who had the luck to win the jackpot of the National Lottery (1891), was now free from material cares and devoted himself totally to painting. In 1893 he chose Crozant as his favorite residence. Not far from the Crozant church is a bronze bust of Guillaumin.
- Ernest Victor Hareux (1847-1909) is known as a member of the dauphinoise school, but like many of his contemporaries he was involved for a time in the Creuse valleys.
- Ernst Josephson (1851-1906)
- Édouard Pail (1851-1916)
- Maurice Leloir (1853-1940), and the Leloir dynasty
- Alfred Smith (1854-1932)
- Pierre Ernest Ballue (1855-1928), who was also associated with the Barbizon School
- Léon Detroy (1857-1955)
- Henri Charrier (1859-1950)
- Fernand Maillaud (1862-1948)
- Paul Madeline (1863-1920)
- William Didier-Pouget (1864-1959)
- Eugène Alluaud (1866-1947)
- Clémentine Ballot (1879-1964)
- Anders Osterlind (1887-1960)
- Solange Christauflour (1900-1953)

=== Author and poet ===
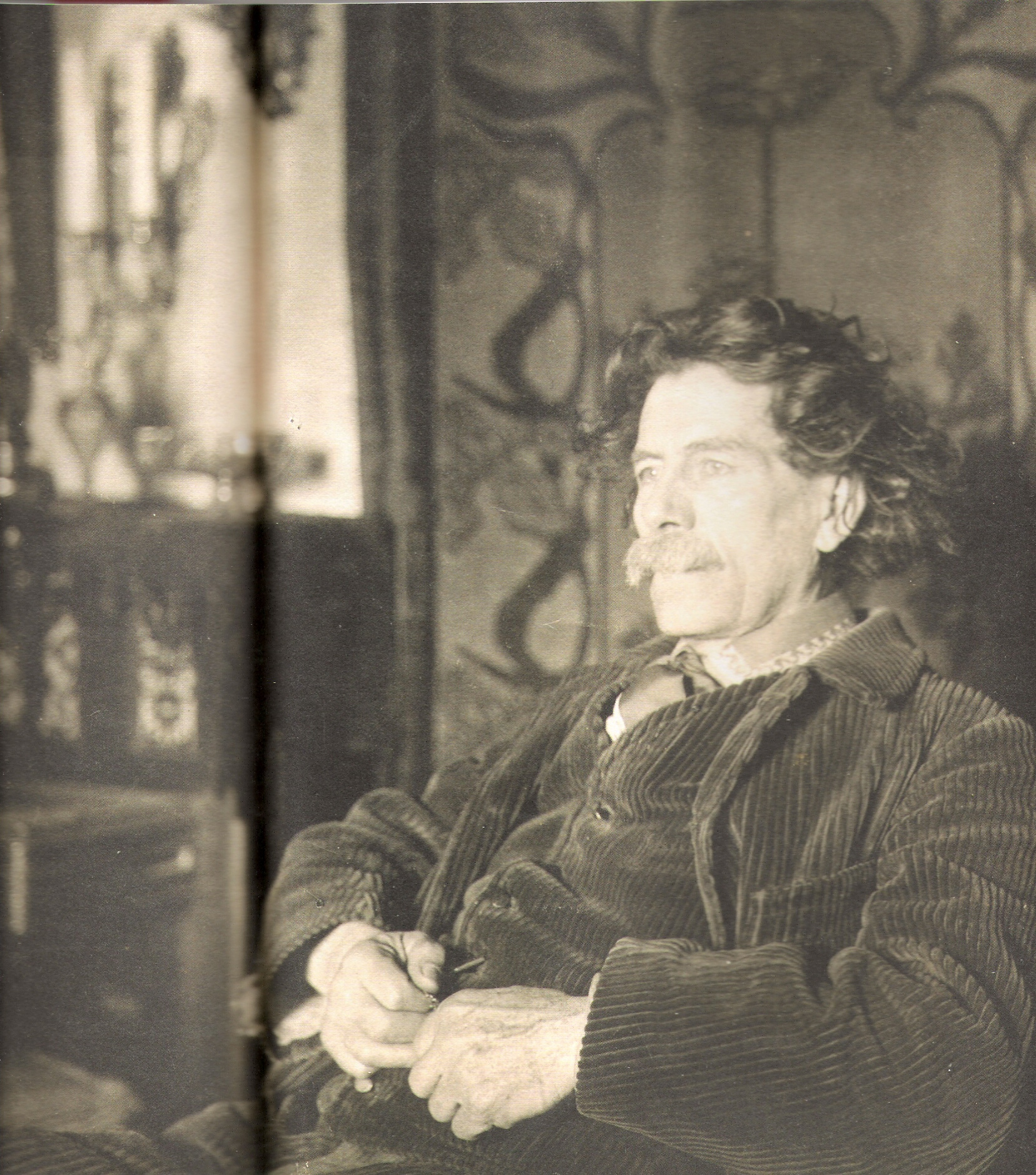
Maurice Rollinat in 1898

The poet Maurice Rollinat (1846-1903), godson of George Sand, retired to Fresselines in 1883 to continue his work there. He was surrounded with friends with whom he shared the last years of his life. Maurice Leblanc visited Rollinat, whom he had known in Paris. In 1886, he published l'Abîme (The Abyss), then Paysages et Paysans (Landscapes and Peasants) and a prose collection En errant (Wandering). On Rollinat's death in 1903, Auguste Rodin offered the Fresselines commune a bas-relief entitled "Poet and the Muse". This sculpture is on display on the wall of the village church.

== Epilogue ==
In 1926, a new story began for the banks of the Creuse, which were flooded by the waters of the largest dam in Europe at the time, the Eguzon Dam, for production of hydroelectricity. The new tourist attraction is now Lac de Chambon. The deep gorges lost some of the wilderness character that had appealed to the painters, but the region gained a tourist area in the "Plage de Fougères".
