= Alfred Smith (artist) =

French painter

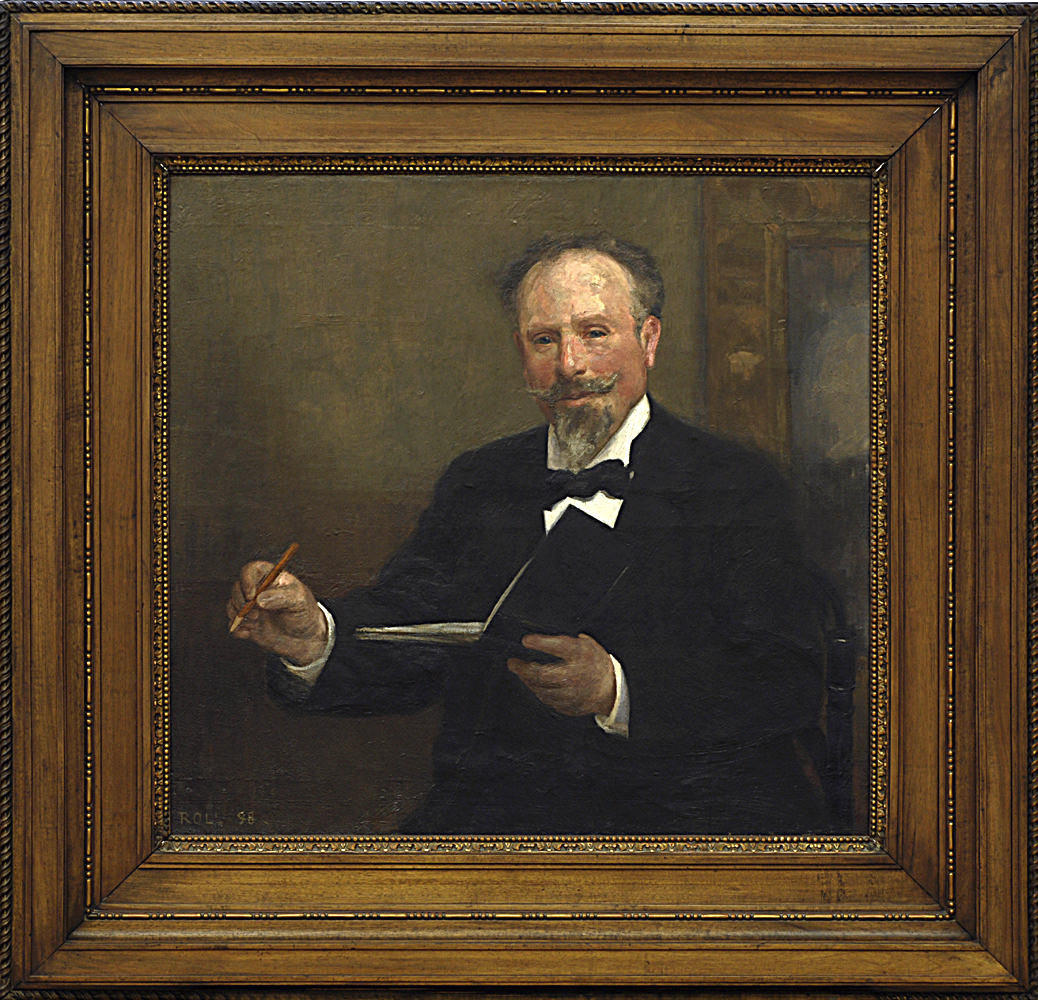
- Portrait by Alfred Roll
- Born: 1854; Bordeaux, France
- Died: 1936 (aged 81–82); Paris, France
- Known for: Painter
- Movement: Impressionism, Post-Impressionism, Fauvism

Alfred Smith (1854–1932) was a French artist from Bordeaux who painted in the Impressionist, Post-Impressionism and Fauvist style. Some of his works resemble the early works of Claude Monet.

== Biography ==
Smith was born in Bordeaux in 1854 to a father of Welsh origin and a mother from Bordeaux. He joined a circle of local landscape artists who followed Courbet and Corot. Smith studied with Hippolyte Pradelles (1876), Léonce Chabry (1880) and Amadeus Baudit (1884). The distinguished artist Alfred Philippe Roll noticed Smith and helped to promote his work. He exhibited in the Salon in Paris in 1880, earning an honorable mention. In 1883 his painting Le quai de Bacalan le soir was exhibited at the Salon. In the 1880s he became the new leader of the Bordeaux school, displacing Louis Auguin. However, with no need to earn a living he did not fully devote himself to painting until 1886.

In 1888 he was given a third class medal at the Salon des Artistes français, and in 1889 a bronze medal. In 1894 he was named a chevalier of the Legion of Honour. Smith won a bronze medal at the Exposition Universelle in Paris in 1900. He exhibited regularly at French salons into the 1920s, and many of his works are held in French and Italian museums. Smith was distinguished for the atmospheric evocation of the woods, gardens and cityscapes, with a subtle and nuanced palette. He painted scenes from Bordeaux, Paris and Venice before discovering the Creuse valley. As Smith's style matured he adapted a brighter palette, displayed in his landscapes of the Creuse valley. He has been called a member of the Crozant School, a broad collection of artists who painted nature around this village of the Creuse valley.

He died in Paris in 1936.

== Works ==
Les Quais de Bordeaux, Le Soir (1892) was exhibited at the Société des Amis des Arts, where it was purchased by the town and is now in the collection of the Musée des Beaux-Arts de Bordeaux. It was hailed as the best painting of the exhibition. The Musée d'Orsay has three of his works: Sous-Bois (1891), Harmonie d'été (1911) and Portrait de la mère de l'artiste (undated). The Telfair Museum of Art in Savannah, Georgia owns the 1903 Le déjeuner sous les bois (Luncheon Under the Trees).

Paintings in private collections include:

- 1884 After the rain, oil on canvas
- 1889 Boat Trip, oil on canvas
- 1890 L'aquarelliste, oil on canvas

== Gallery ==
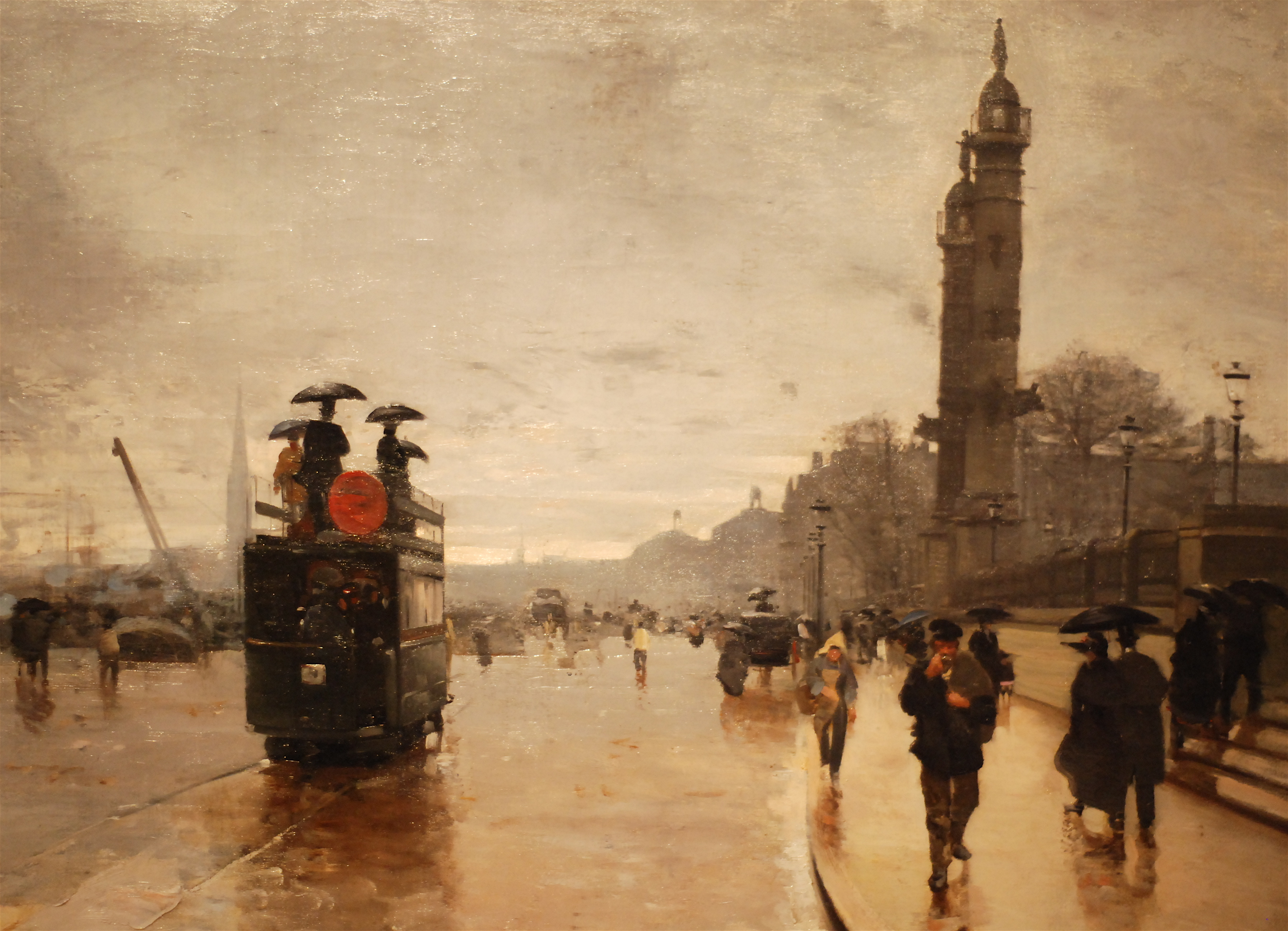
Tramway devant les Quinconces par temps de pluie 1880

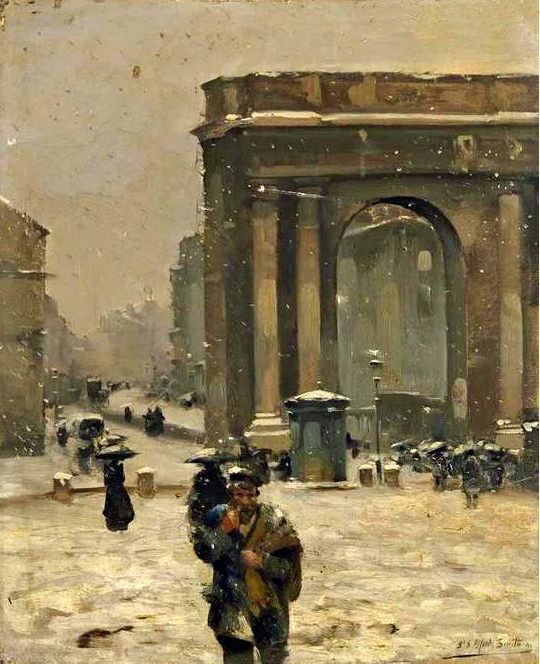
Brouillard à Bordeaux, 1880

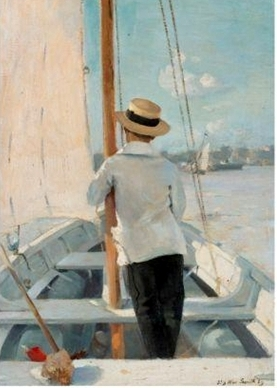
Boat trip, 1889

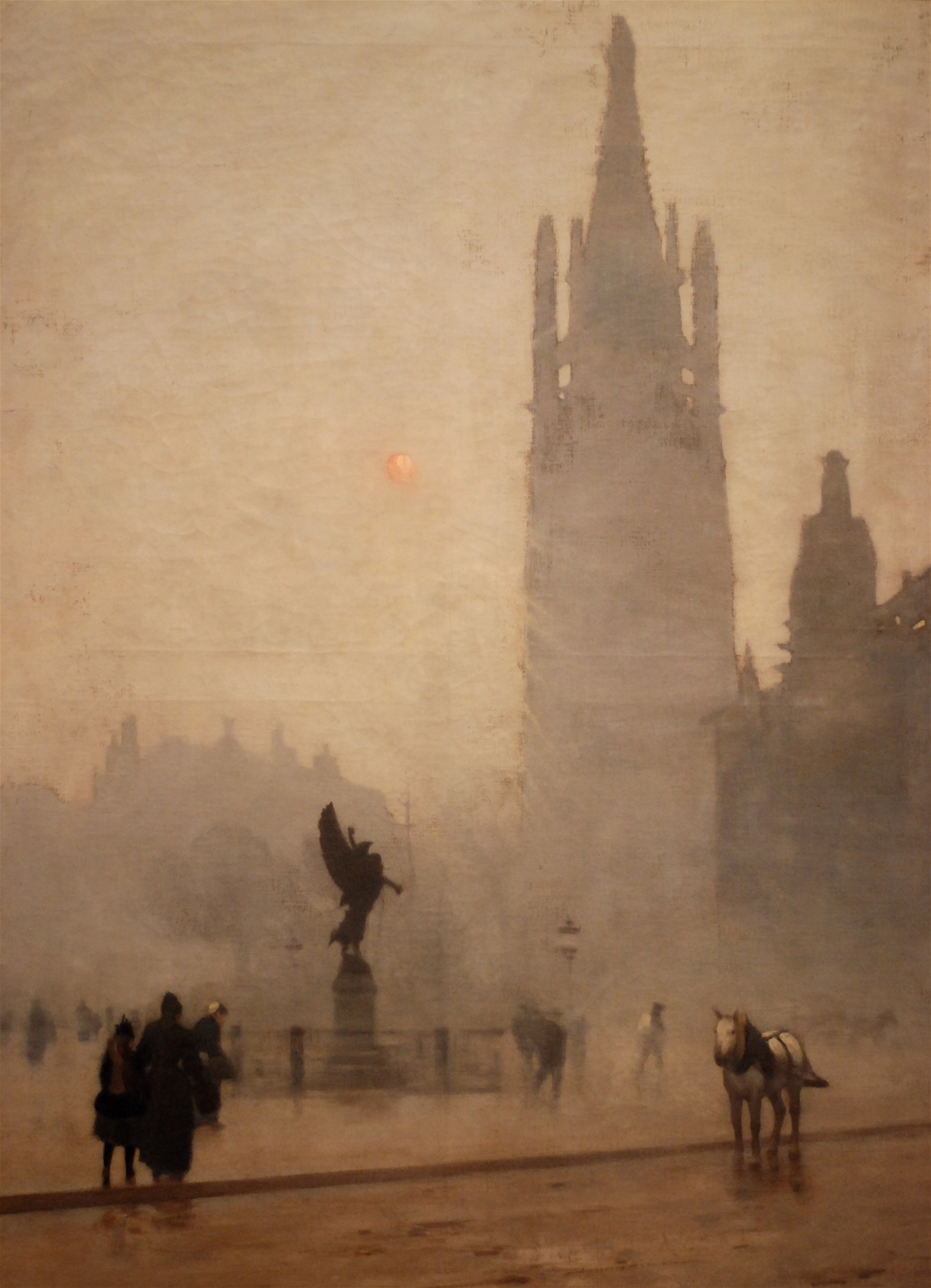
Matinée d'hiver, place Pey Berland à Bordeaux, before 1893

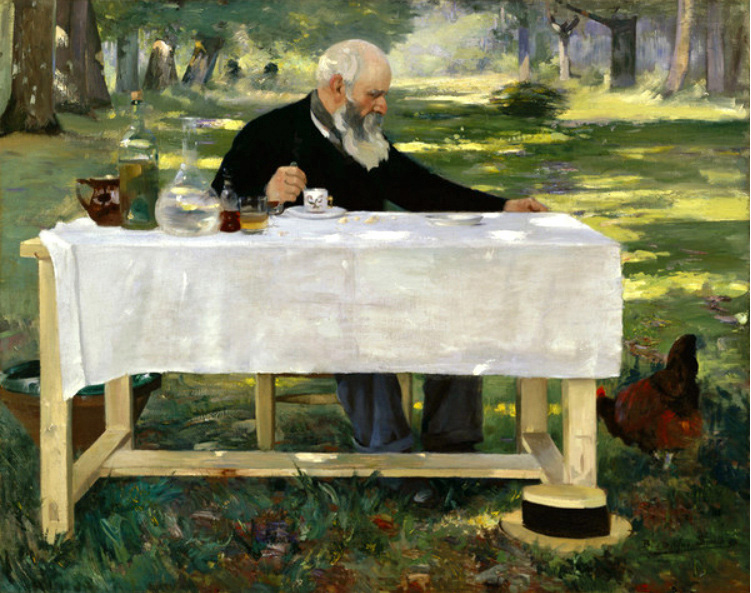
Déjeuner sous les bois, before 1895

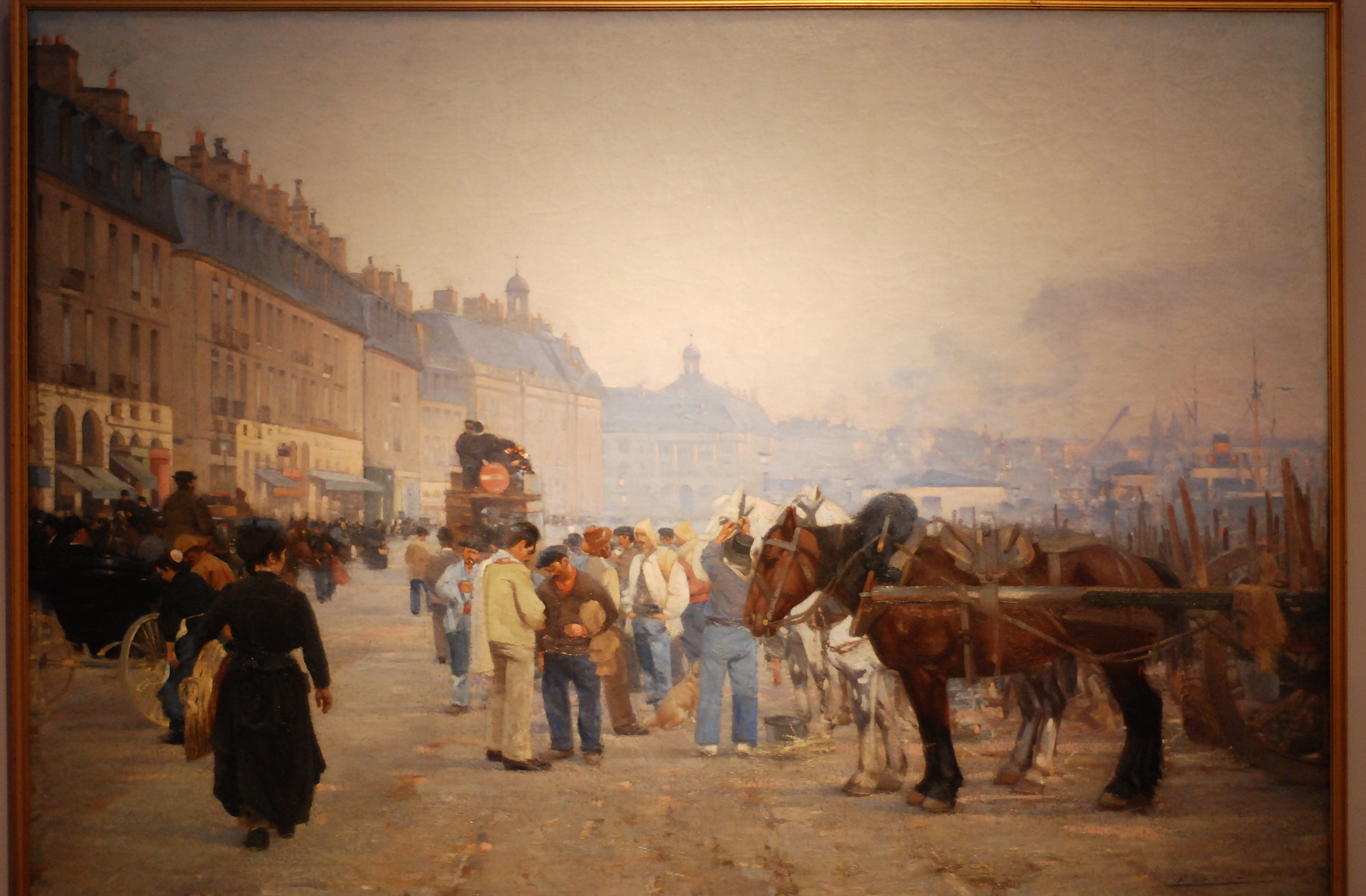
Les quais de Bordeaux, le matin, 1895

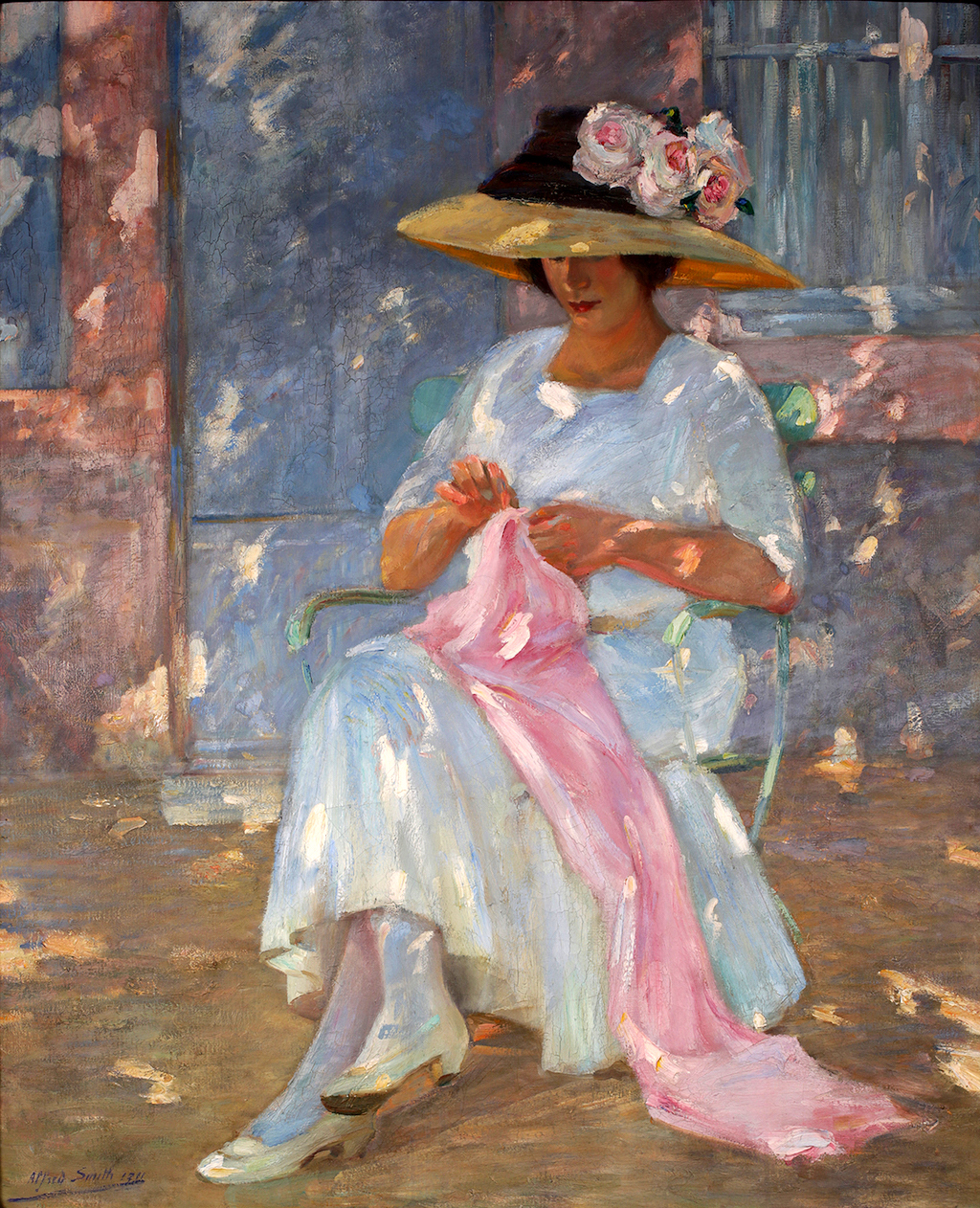
Harmonie d'été, 1899

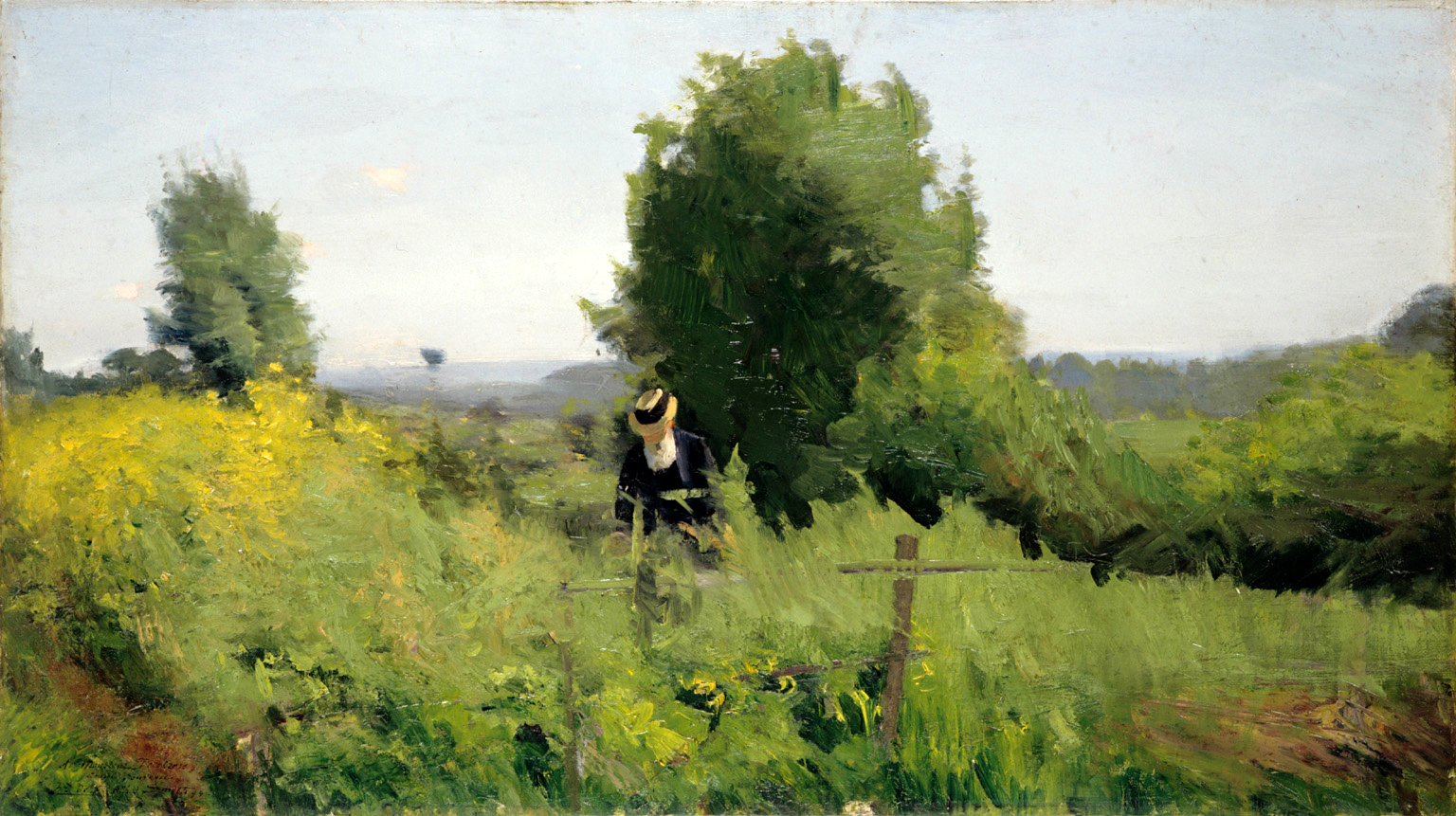
Le père Boyreau au printemps, c. 1900

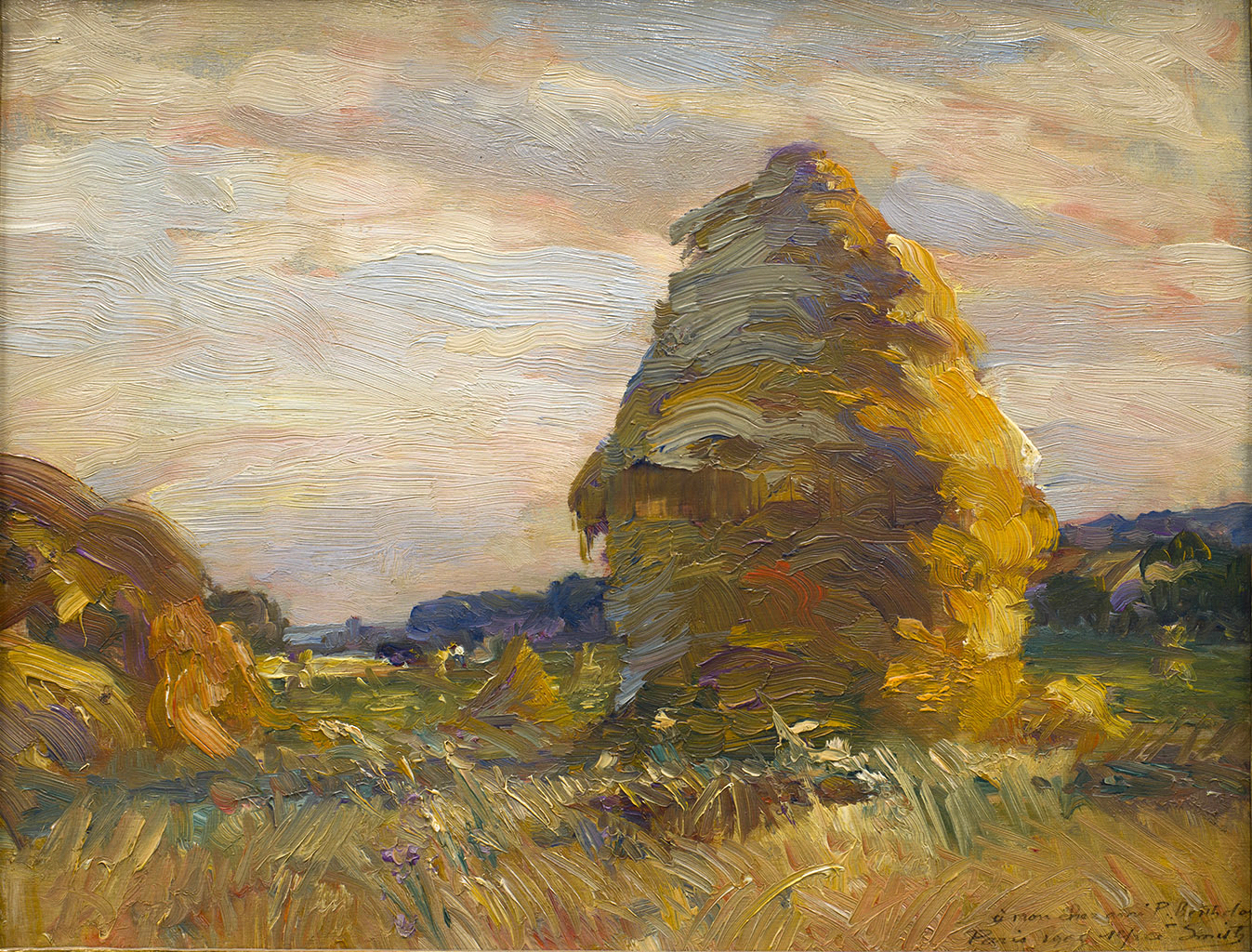
La meule, 1900

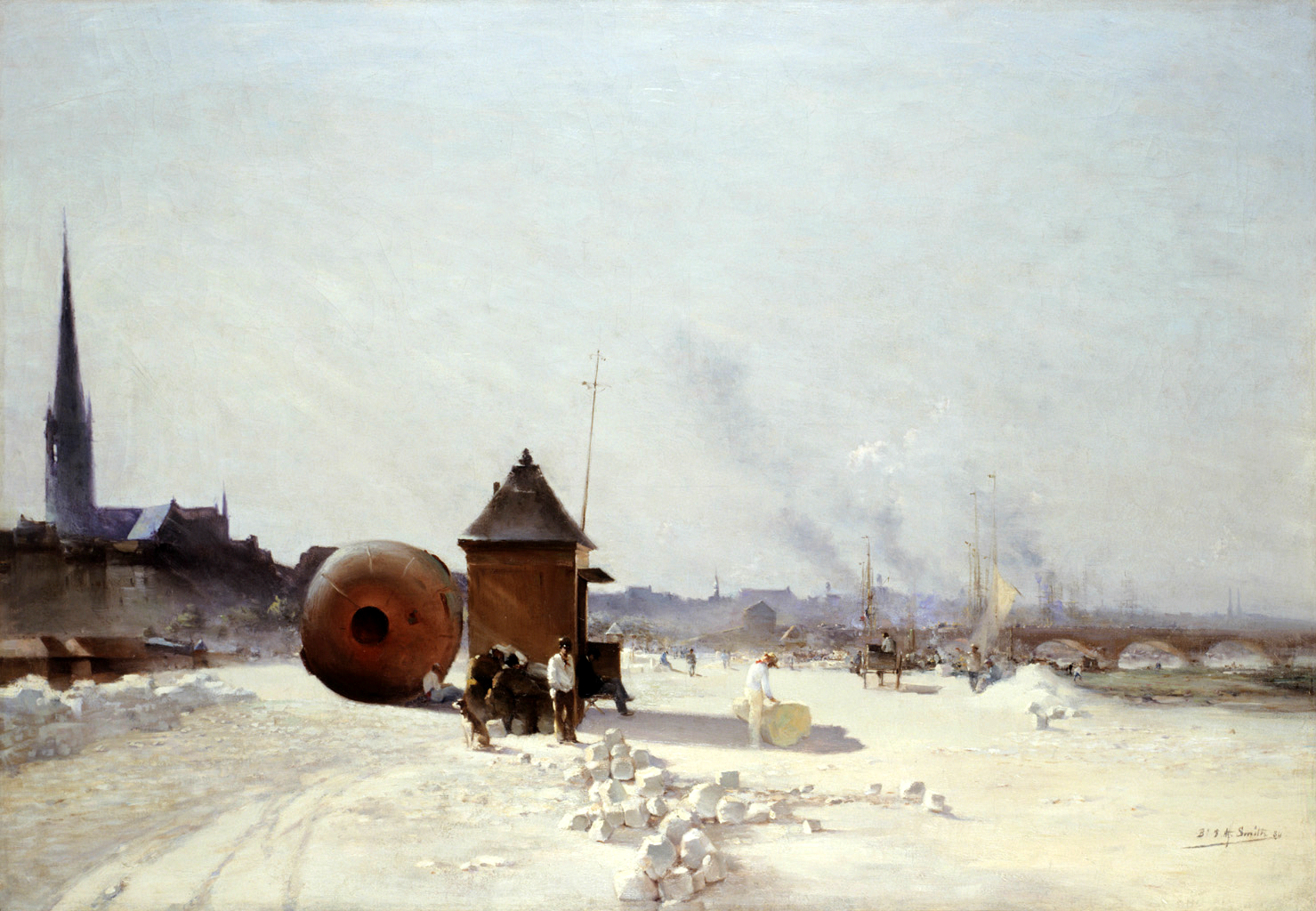
Quai de la Grave Bordeaux, c. 1900

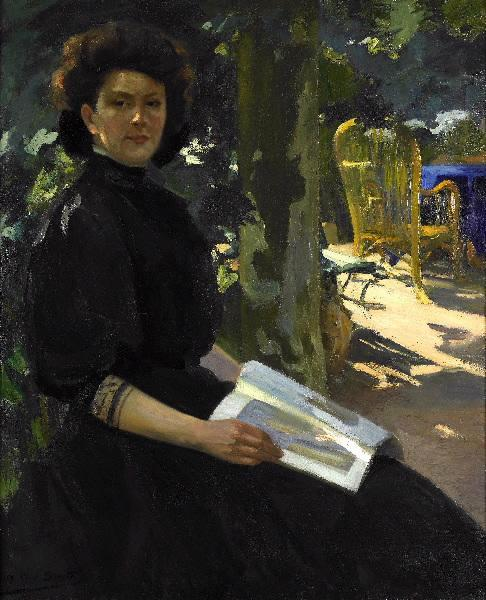
Jeune fille lisant, 1910

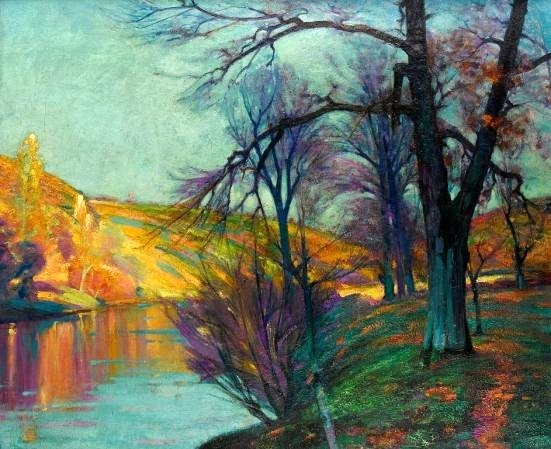
Bords de la Creuse, Automne, c. 1920

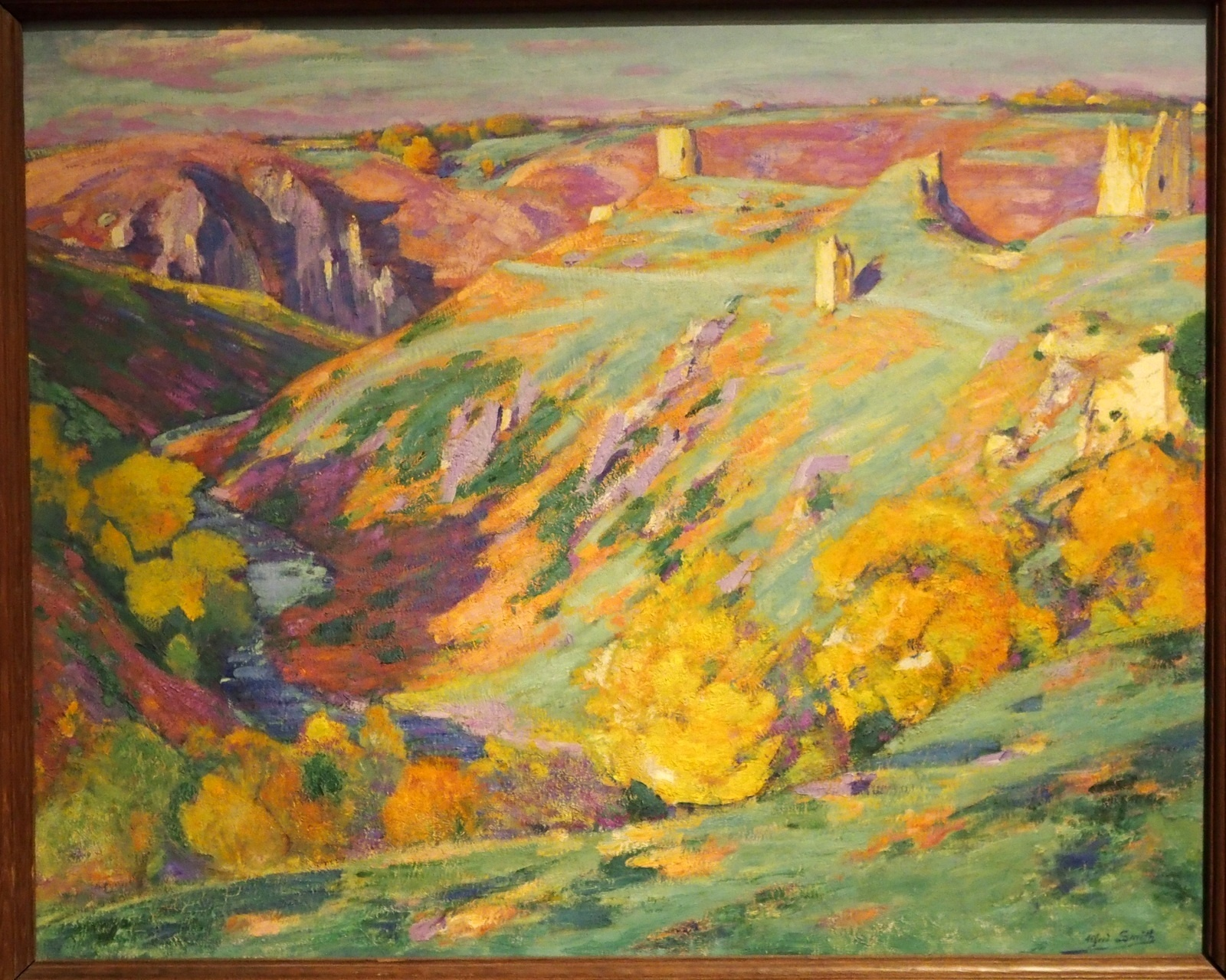
Crozant La Sédelle en octobre, c. 1923
