= William Didier-Pouget =

French artist

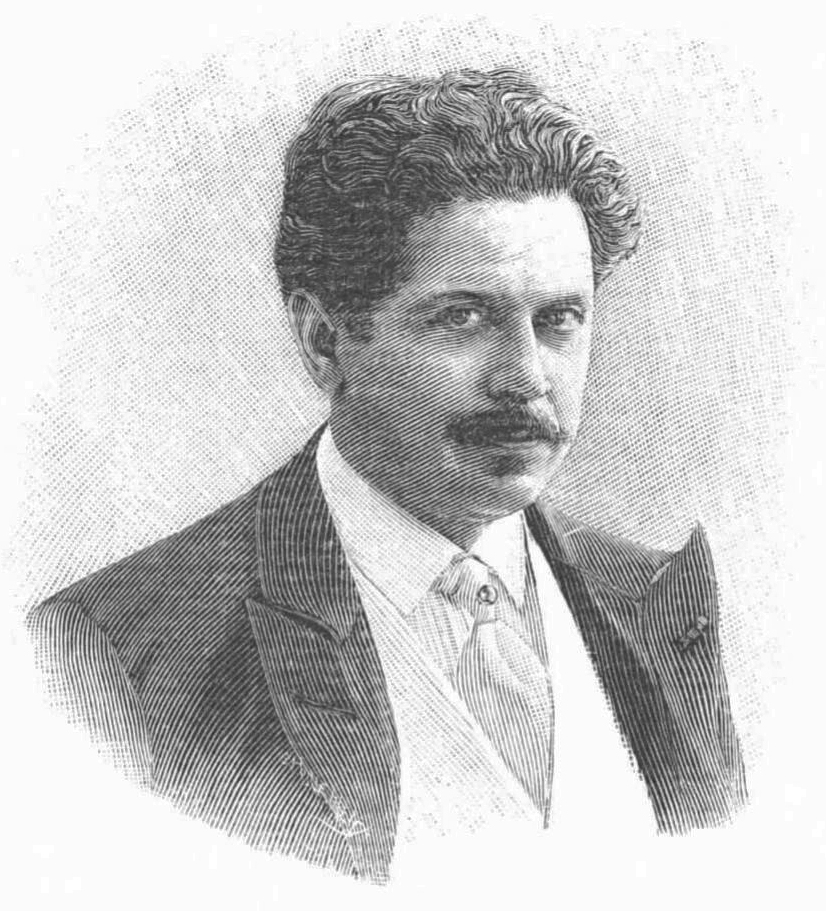
- William Didier-Pouget, 1906 engraving
- Born: 14 November 1864; Toulouse, Haute-Garonne, France
- Died: 12 September 1959 (aged 94); Digulleville, Basse-Normandie, France
- Resting place: Cimetière de Montmartre
- Known for: Painting
- Notable work: Bruyère à l'aube, Morning in the valley of Correze, La Vallée de L'Aumance, Paysage (Musée des Beaux-Arts de Bordeaux), Bruyères en fleurs, Brume du matin (Musée Fabre, Montpellier), Lever de lune sur la lande (Musée, Barbezieux-Saint-Hilaire)
- Movement: Impressionism, "La Peinture Claire", Crozant School
- Awards: Legion of Honour - Officer (1901)

William Didier-Pouget (14 November 1864 – 12 September 1959) was a French artist known for his landscape paintings. He focused primarily on the countryside of southern France, infusing his landscapes, always painted outdoors (en plein air), with light and color. Didier-Pouget is associated with the later phase of Impressionism, although not actually identified with the group of artists typically known as the Impressionists. His career as an exhibiting artist stems from 1886 onwards. He was a member of the Société des Artistes Français, a member of l'École de Crozant and Société des peintres de montagne. Also, laureate of l'Institut au Concours Troyon, Officer of the order of Nichan Iftikar (Order of Glory, Tunisia), and Officer of the Legion of Honour.

== History ==
=== Early life ===
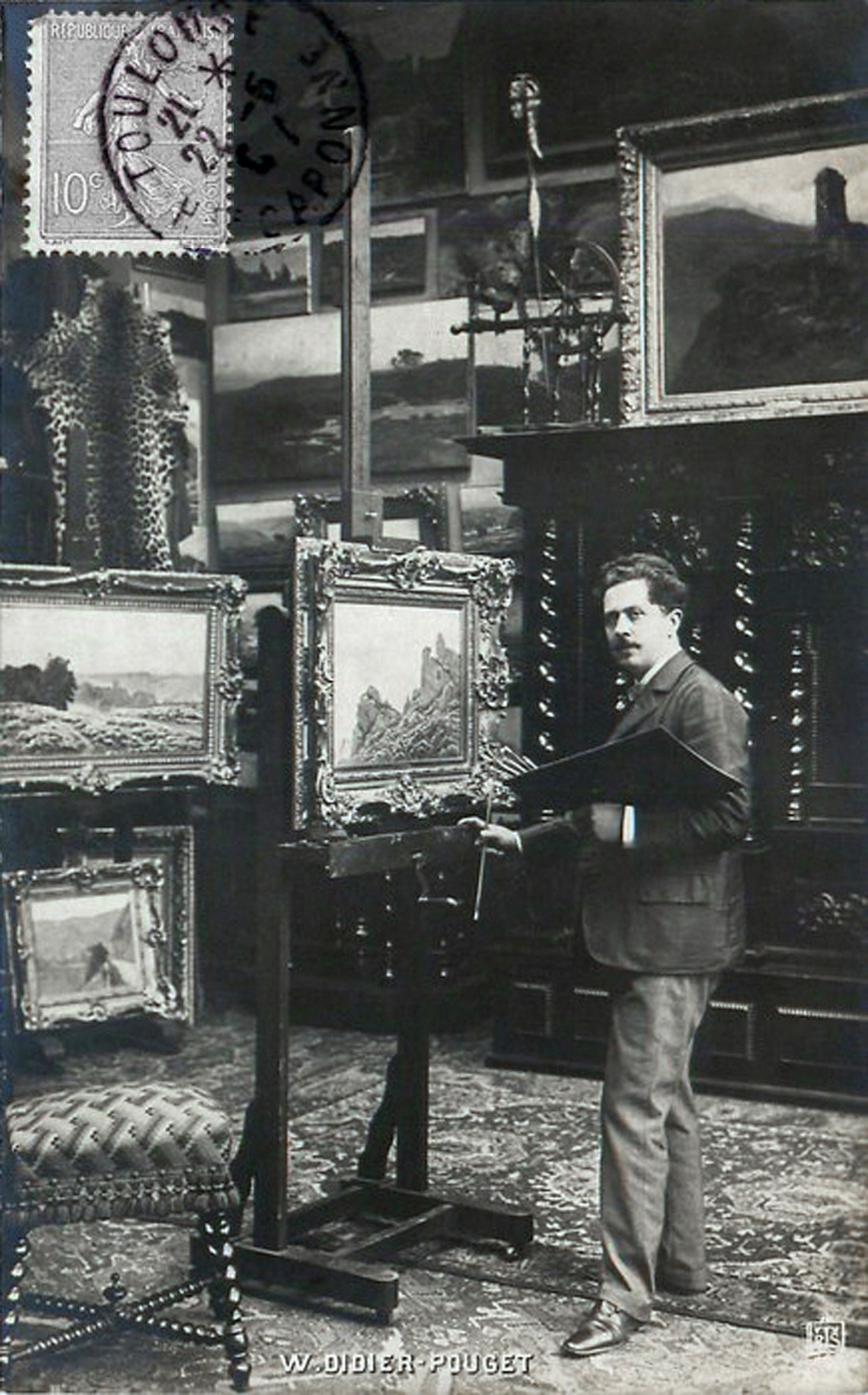
William Didier-Pouget circa 1907 in his studio, 12 Boulevard de Clichy, Paris (Postcard)

William Didier-Pouget was born in Toulouse. He was the son of a newspaper editor. Antoine Paul Jules Edgar Pouget, a nature lover, encouraged William in his ambition to become an artist. The two would often take long walks together, the elder pointing out natural phenomena while discussing methods of their pictorial representation. He related biographical details of the great artists, past and present, and in every possible way trained the boy while rousing his ambition.

Didier-Pouget began his formal art training at the École des Beaux-Arts in the city of Toulouse. He later studied at the Académie de Paris with Amédée (Jean Amédée) Baudit (1826–1890), a French landscape painter, and made his debut at the Salon de Paris in 1886. He later studied with Louis-Augustin Auguin, an associate of Gustave Courbet and Jean-Baptiste Corot. Ultimately, Didier-Pouget was accepted into the studio of Maxime Lalanne, the celebrated artist, illustrator and etcher. Under these influences many profitable years followed. The seeds were sown for what would become Didier-Pouget's fruitful career as an artist.

William Didier-Pouget married Caroline Salley (1863–1949) and had a daughter, Yvonne (1885–1971). Yvonne Aubert-Didier-Pouget (aka Charline Abbeille) became an artist painter and miniaturist.

=== Painting career ===
William Didier-Pouget, ca.1909, Matinée dans le Limousin, Bruyères en fleurs (Bergère), oil on canvas, 240 x 170 cm

William Didier-Pouget, Matinée dans le Limousin, Bruyères en fleurs, postcard, Salon 1910

In Toulouse, the young artist had already been regarded as a prodigy of talent, and great things were expected of him. Paintings were exhibited in the provinces, attracting much attention, and found many purchasers. Encouraged, Didier-Pouget sought a wider audience, and moved to Paris; a wise step for his career. From 1886 he exhibited regularly at the Salons, each new season showing a marked advancement in his art, "bringing to the world of Paris new and delightful colour-schemes and vivid compositions."

During his early years Didier-Pouget's landscape paintings were temperate and ethereal with a poetic atmosphere. Progressively he began to specialize in a style that would build his considerable reputation all the way to the United States, with many commissioned works both at home and abroad. The artist took pleasure in expressing the tranquil ambiance of river scenes. The soft poesy of his mountainous landscapes are suggestive of Auguin, a disciple of Corot. Didier-Pouget, part of the same school, had cultivated from their groundwork the idea of leaving the foreground largely unobstructed. The importance he attaches to the tree is eloquent; representing for him the opacity of the earth in contrast to the unburdened transparency of the sky, with its silhouette projected onto the horizon. The strong bichromy of his paintings evokes the short time span of the twilight, just after sunset or before the sunrise.

Didier-Pouget excelled in depicting morning and sunset effects. "His scenes of heather bathed in sunshine or glistening with the dew of an autumnal sunrise are rendered with an exceptional verisimilitude, strength, and truth", wrote Wynford Dewhurst in 1901.

William Didier-Pouget, Le soir dans les Hautes Pyrénées, Salon 1904, postcard

During the height of his career, Didier-Pouget's favorite subjects were beautiful fields of heather in the fog, forests filled with light, plateaus in the Creuse Valley, and the Dordogne River winding through the hills. His clients at the time included George I of Greece, Carnegie Museum, the embassy at Saint-Petersbourg, conseil municipal au Capitule de Toulouse, Musée des Ursulines de Mâcon, Palais des Beaux-Arts de la Ville de Paris (Petit Palais), Conseil Municipal de l'Hôtel de Ville (Saint-Bertrand-de-Comminges), and Raymond Poincaré (president of France from 1913 to 1920).

In April 1903, Didier-Pouget exhibited in the United States at the Newark (NJ) Library Art Gallery, and was mentioned in the New-York Tribune, 20 April 1903. The exhibition was organized by George A. Dowden.

Wynford Dewhurst wrote again of Didier-Pouget in 1904: "If the greatest art is to represent an impression of Nature at her best, then the work of Didier-Pouget is great. 'It is truly worth while being a painter to have produced any one of these,' writes the critic of Le Temps. The artist loves best to represent Nature in her peaceful moods, and generally seeks the solitudes of the exquisite hills, valleys, and rivers of the Tarbes countryside, or the rich watershed of La Creuse. Here, in the fresh early-morn, charged with dew and mist, he finds his subjects, overlooking magnificent panoramas of river, hillsides covered with heather, across valleys and plains from which loom out sculpturesque masses of foliage, dark and strong against the blue mist and distant mountain ridge. The painter prefers Nature serene and undisturbed, and introduces but little incident."

He paints the twilight with passion, the waters that glide capriciously beneath the greenery, the flowering heather, the marvelous heather...for the pleasure of the eye [...] These fine droplets that illuminate spontaneous bursts of light in the works of Théodore Rousseau, or the delicate incandescent aura of Camille Corot, are revealed in Didier-Pouget.

William Didier-Pouget, Ajoncs et Bruyères, Salon 1912, postcard

=== Death ===
Didier-Pouget died in Digulleville, France, in 1959 and rests in the 5th division of the Cimetière de Montmartre in Paris, with his parents, wife and daughter.

== Awards ==
Didier-Pouget was named Knight of the Legion of Honour by decree on 15 January 1901 (breveted: 23 March 1901; ceremony: 28 February 1901). He exhibited at various venues and won the gold medal at the Exposition universelle et internationale (1913). He was subsequently selected as a member of the Jury and became a senior member of the Société des Artistes Français. Didier-Pouget at this time was living in a large studio at 12 Boulevard de Clichy, Paris. By decree on 18 July 1933, Didier-Pouget was promoted to Officier of the Legion of Honour by the President of the France's Third Republic, Albert François Lebrun (1932 - 1940).

== Works ==
William Didier-Pouget, ca.1902-1903, Hauts Plateaux de la Corrèze, oil on canvas, 47.5 x 83.5 cm. (18 3/4 x 32 3/4 in.). Sale, Bonhams London, Tuesday, March 27, 2007, Lot 76 (entitled Bruyères en fleurs)

William Didier-Pouget, ca.1907-1908, Bruyères en Fleurs, Le Matin, oil on canvas, 129.5 x 209.6 cm (51 x 82.5 inches). Sale, Sotheby's New York: Thursday, October 24, 1996, Lot 302 (entitled Bruyeres en fleurs: Le matin)

William Didier-Pouget, ca.1907-1908, Le Matin, Bruyères en Fleurs (Auvergne), oil on canvas, 182.9 x 251.8 cm (detail). Sale: Sotheby's New York, Wednesday, October 13, 1993, Lot 16, titled Ruins of Crozant (Creuze)

William Didier-Pouget, Lande aux Bruyères, Plateau de Ger (Hautes-Pyrénées), oil on canvas, 55 x 85 cm, Collection d'Art de la Ville de Paris, Palais des Beaux-Arts, Paris
