= Nebria boiteli =

Scientific classification
- Domain: Eukaryota
- Kingdom: Animalia
- Phylum: Arthropoda
- Class: Insecta
- Order: Coleoptera
- Suborder: Adephaga
- Family: Carabidae
- Genus: Nebria
- Species: N. boiteli

Binomial name
- Nebria boiteli Alluaud, 1932

Synonyms
- Nebria baudoni Antoine, 1955

Species of beetle

Nebria boiteli is a species of ground beetle in the Nebriinae subfamily that is endemic to Morocco.
