= The Young Republic =

1908 painting by Alfred Philippe Roll

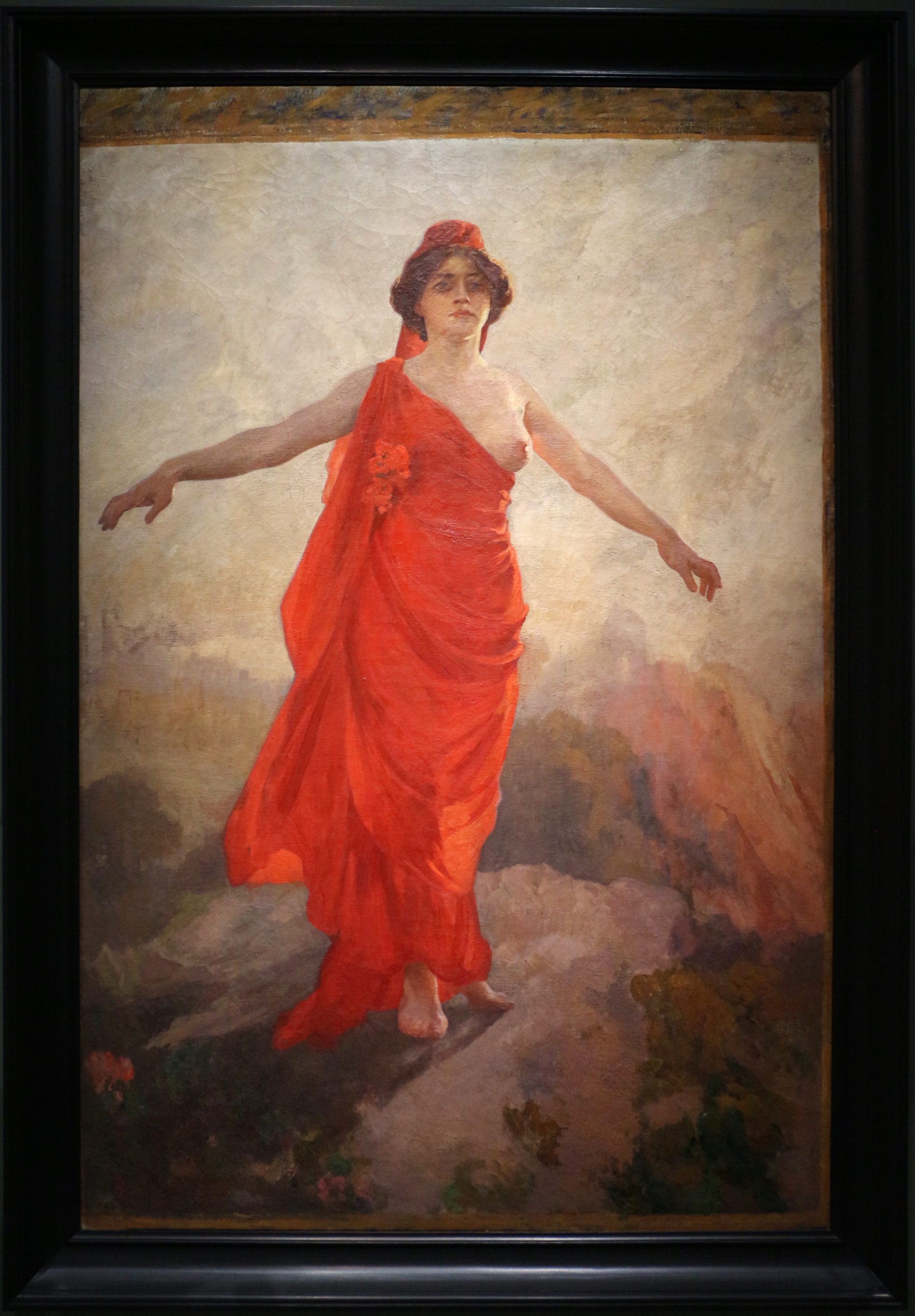
- Artist: Alfred Philippe Roll
- Year: 1908
- Medium: oil painting
- Dimensions: 205.5 cm × 135.4 cm (80.9 in × 53.3 in)
- Location: Musée d'Orsay, Paris
- Accession: LUX 810

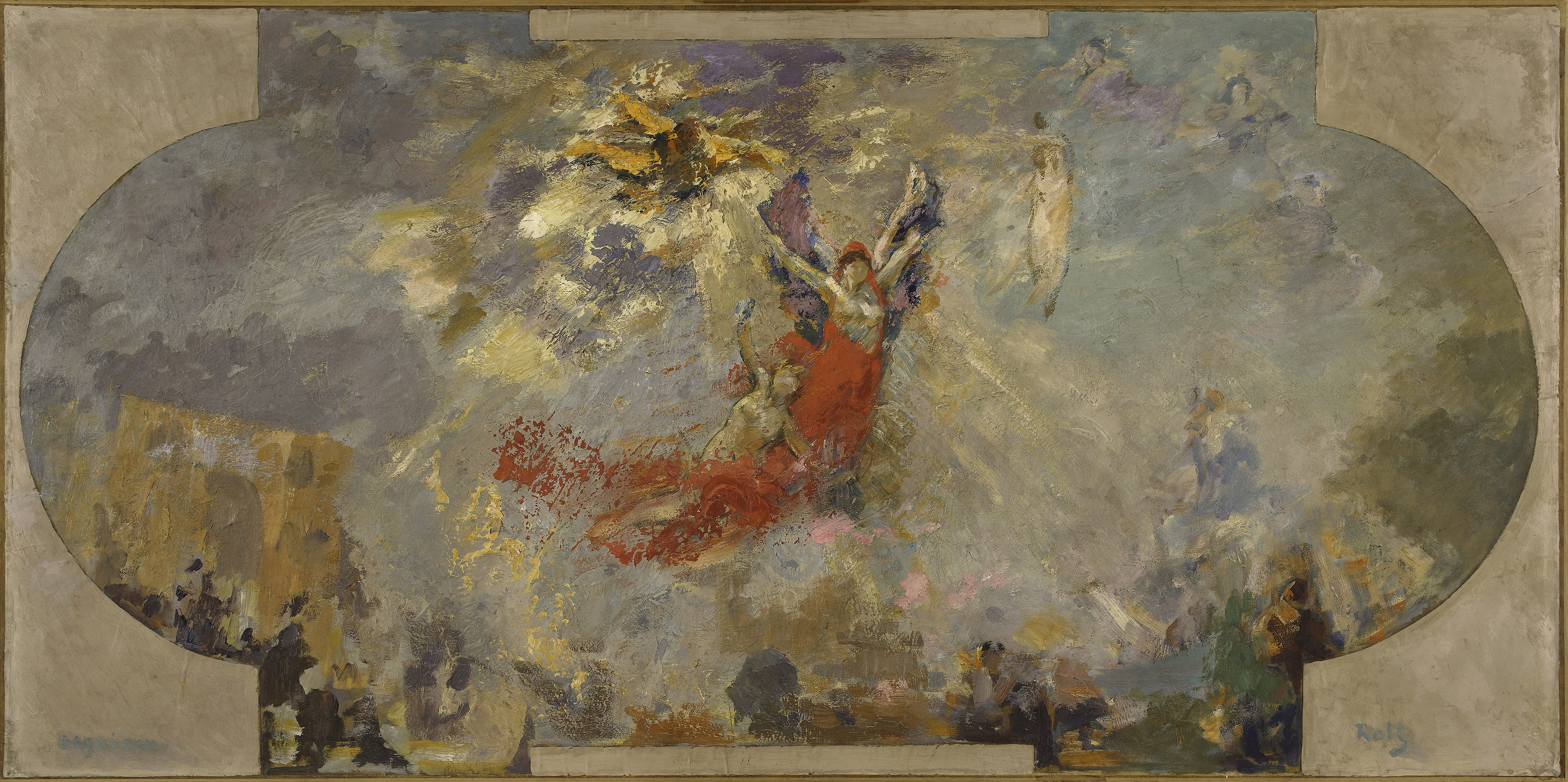
Alfred Philippe Roll - sketch of design for the Petit Palais

The Young Republic (French: La Jeune Republique) is a 1908 painting by Alfred Philippe Roll. It is currently in the collections of the Musée d’Orsay in Paris.

== Provenance ==
The painting was first exhibited at the 1909 Salon National des Beaux-Arts. It was bought by the French government from the salon for 8,000 francs, and from 1910 to 1920, it was held at the Musée du Luxembourg. From 1920 to 2012, it was held at the Musée National d'Histoire Naturelle. It was then assigned to the Louvre and allocated to the Musée d’Orsay in 2012.

== Description ==
The republic is depicted as a young woman in a flame-red robe with one breast bared. She has her arms stretched out as if to steady herself as she walks through a rough and barren landscape. This portrayal is quite distinct from the traditional portrayal of the republic as Marianne which was the norm in the Third Republic. Roll’s 1913 design for the ceiling of the south gallery of the Petit Palais also depicted the Republic as a female figure dressed in a robe of similar colour, but this figure is a triumphant allegorical presence with her arms raised as she soars above Paris.

== Significance ==
The Third Republic understood the importance of disseminating republican ideals through imagery, and supported the development of a public cult of the Republic. Between 1880 and 1900, more than 220 public monuments were erected, 90 of which directly depicted the Republic itself, while others celebrated prominent figures representing republican virtues. Alongside these large public pieces, numerous smaller or domestic works of art were circulated, such as sculpted busts or profiles, medals and lithographs.

Roll was regarded as a semi-official painter of the French Third Republic, both free from the traditional academic constraints of painting, but sufficiently widely recognised not to be subversive. He was able to give artistic expression to aspirations of the Republic to create a new society that was democratic in outlook and imbued with social justice. He has been described as translating into painting the ideas of Emile Zola in a series of large paintings on war, strike, peasants and workers. At his hands, social realism became the officially favoured artistic style, and he played a key role in establishing the new style that celebrated a France which was both democratic and industrial.

Within a few years of its creation, the image of The Young Republic was being reproduced and used in French propaganda during the First World War.

== Exhibition history ==
- Salon de la Société nationale des beaux-arts - Galeries nationales du Grand Palais - Paris, France, 1909, n°1001
- Paintings and Sketches by Alfred Philippe Roll - The Buffalo Fine Arts Academy, Albright Art Gallery - Buffalo, USA 1915, n°15
- Millet, Courbet et le naturalisme français: chefs-d'oeuvre du musée d'Orsay - China Art Museum - Shanghai, China 2012-2013
