= Hippolyte Pradelles =

French painter

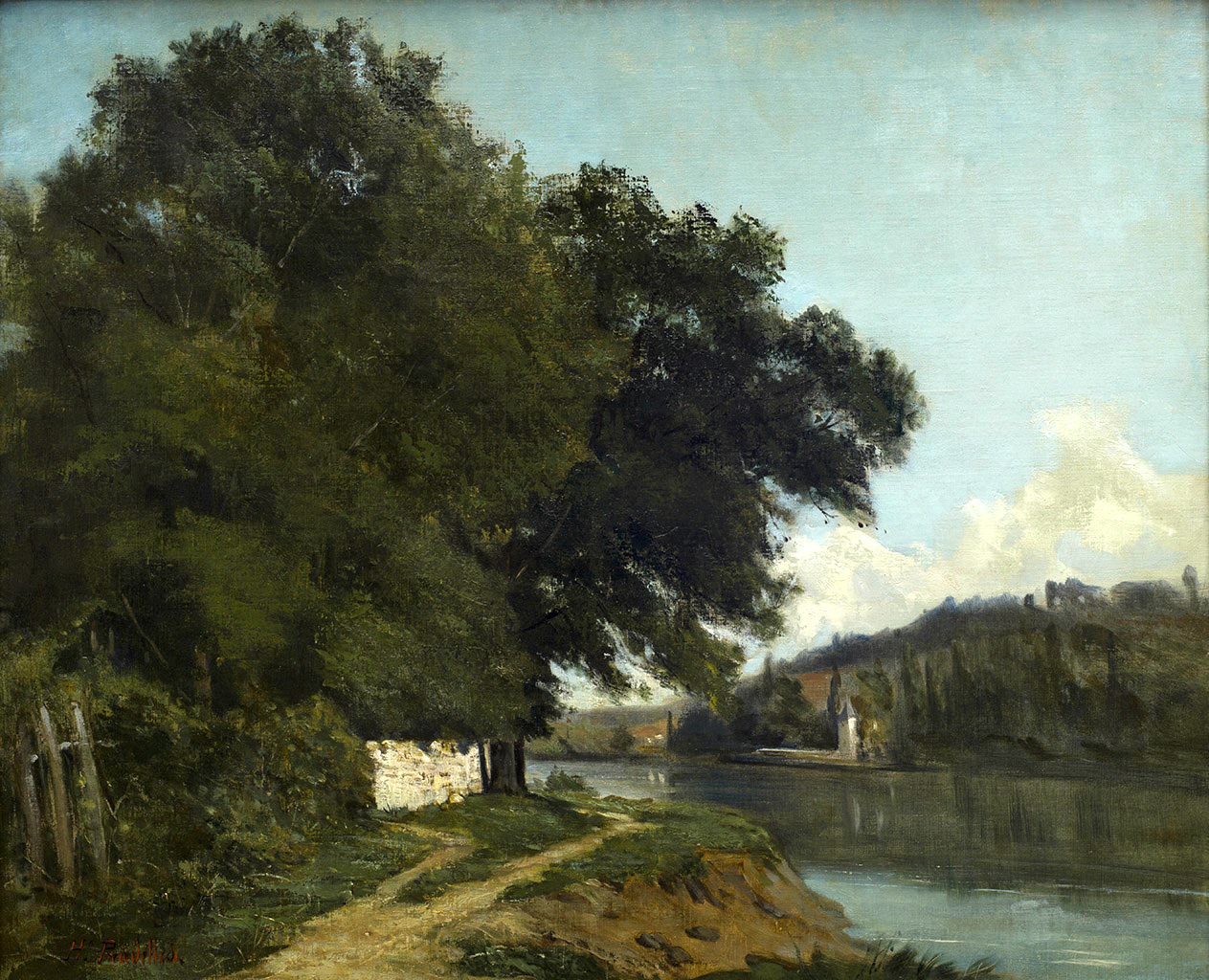
Banks of the Garonne by Pradelles

Justin Jean-Baptiste Hippolyte Pradelles (29 March 1824 – 6 January 1913) was a French landscape painter. Initially working as a draughtsman and watercolourist, Pradelles later moved into painting, principally producing regional landscapes but also genre and military scenes.

== Life ==
The son of an army officer, he was born in Strasbourg. He studied under Gabriel-Christophe Guérin and Gustave Brion. He volunteered to fight in the Crimean War, where he made several drawings, including four published in L'Illustration. A corporal in the 6th Line Infantry Regiment, he was evacuated for health reasons, convalesced in his regimental depot in Saintes and resumed work as an artist.

He joined with Louis-Augustin Auguin, Jean-Baptiste Corot and Gustave Courbet to form the short-lived Port-Berteau group in 1862. It painted landscapes in the open air around Bussac-sur-Charente until 1863, when it was dissolved. Pradelles and Auguin based themselves in Bordeaux from 1863 onwards, where Pradelles set up a studio and trained other artists. He exhibited at the salon of the Société des Amis des Arts de Bordeaux and Société des Amis des Arts de Strasbourg. He died in Bordeaux.

== Sources ==
- "CMPC Dossiers : De l'influence de Courbet en saintonge". alienor.org. Archived from the original on 2012-09-01.
