= Alluaud =

Alluaud is a surname. Notable people with the surname include:

- Charles A. Alluaud (1861–1949), French entomologist
- Eugène Alluaud (1866–1947), French landscape painter and ceramicist
- François Alluaud (1778–1866), French porcelain manufacturer, geologist and mineralogist
