= Gustave Brion =

French painter and illustrator (1824–1877)

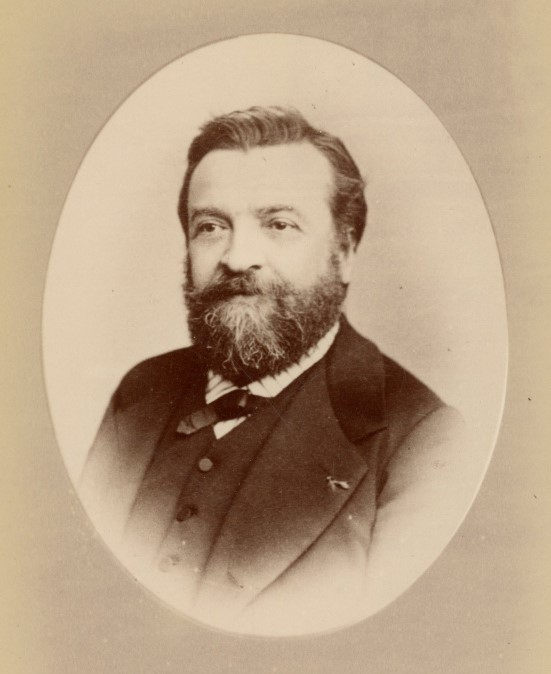
Gustave Brion

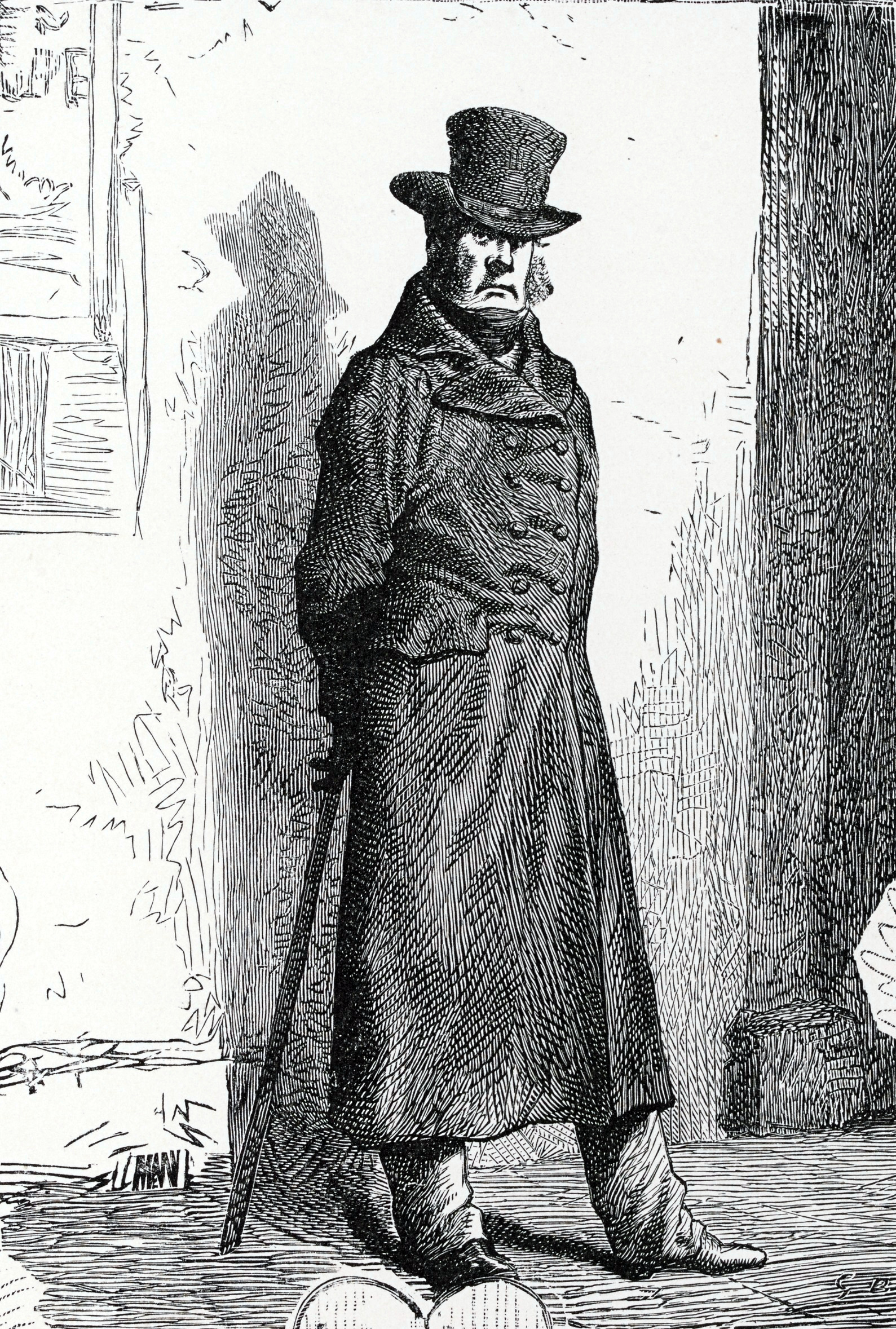
Javert, from Les Misérables by Victor Hugo, published in 1862.

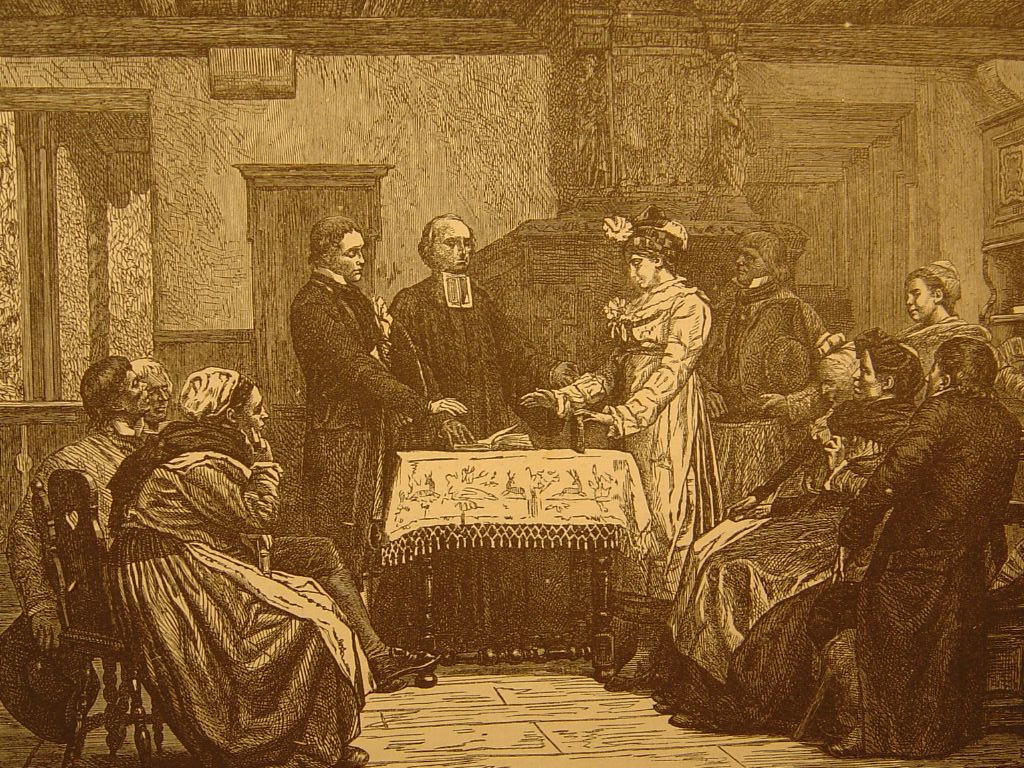
A Wedding in Alsace, 1872

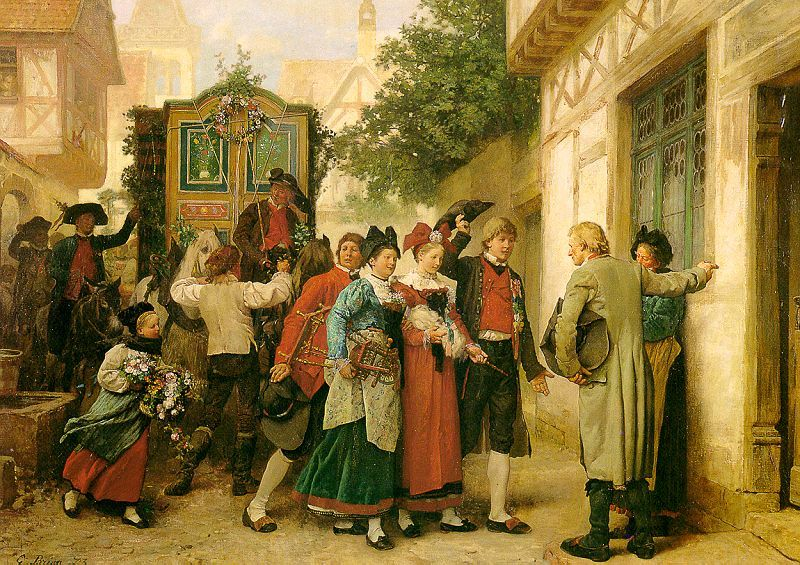
Procession in Strasbourg, 1873

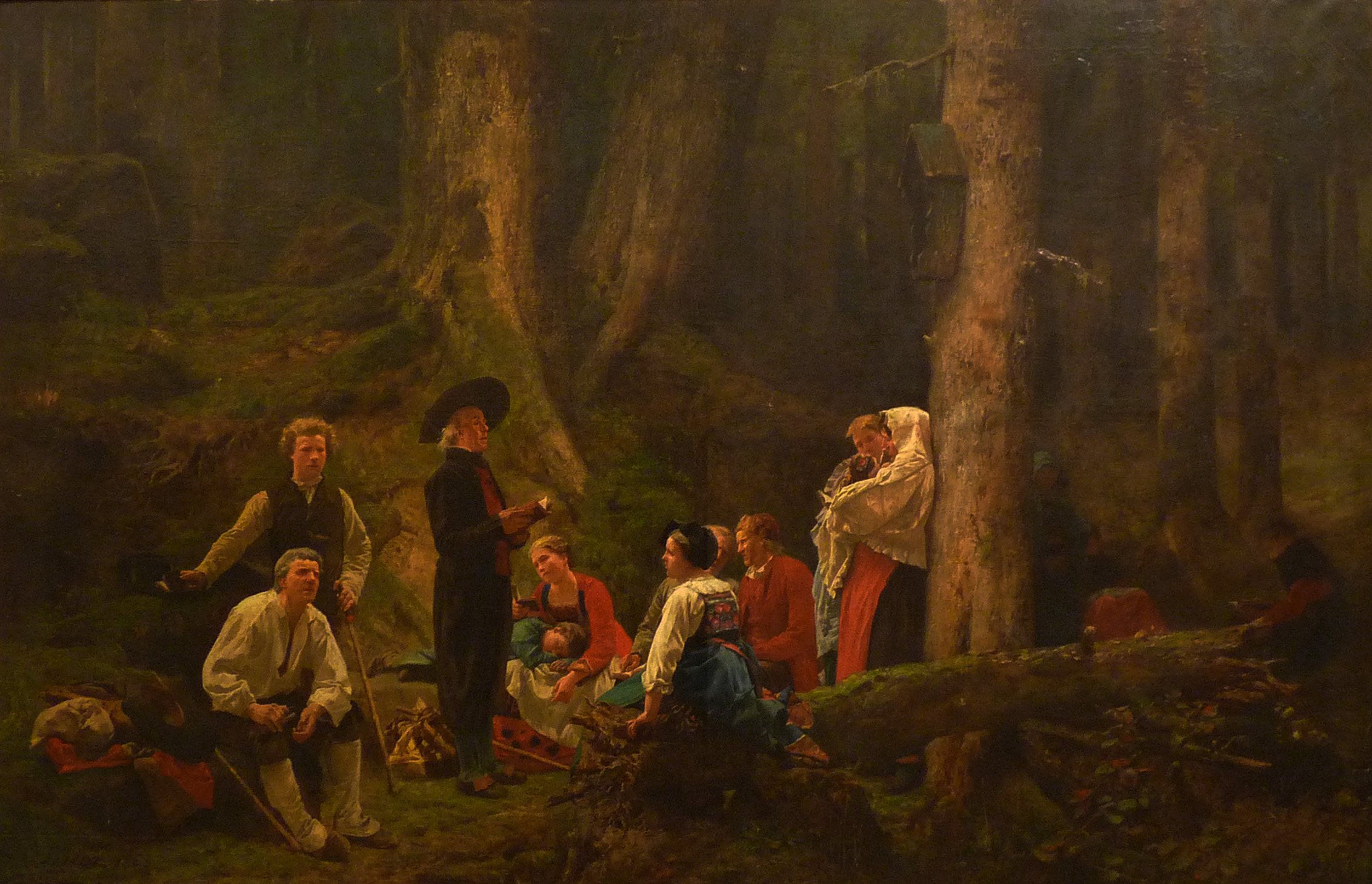
The pilgrims of Sainte Odile (Unterlinden Museum), Colmar

Gustave Brion (1824–1877) was a French painter and illustrator best known for his depictions of rural life in Alsace and for his illustrations of Victor Hugo’s Les Misérables and The Hunchback of Notre-Dame.

He was born at Rothau in the department of Bas-Rhin on 24 October 1824 and studied in Strasbourg under the painter Gabriel-Cristophe Guérin and then the sculptor Andreas Friedrich. In 1847, his exhibited Intérieur à Dambach at the Salon of 1847. A few years later, he moved to a studio on rue Notre-Dame-des-Champs, in the same building as Realist artists Jules Breton and François Bonvin.

Brion gained recognition for his genre paintings depicting the peasant life and customs of Alsace, though he occasionally painted historical subjects, such as The Siege of a Town by Romans under Julius Caesar, commissioned by Napoleon III. He earned a Second-Class Medal at the Paris Salon of 1853 for his paintings Schlitteurs de la Forêt-Noire and Potato Harvest during an Inundation. The former was later destroyed during the Franco-Prussian War. In 1863, his work Les Fleurs du Pays earned him a First-Class Medal at the Salon of 1863, along with the Legion of Honour. Additional honors followed at the Exposition Universelle of 1867 and the Salon of 1868.

In addition to painting, Brion worked as a book illustrator. He designed over 200 illustrations for the first edition of Hugo's novel Les Misérables, including the first published portrayal of Inspector Javert. His illustrations for the author's The Hunchback of Notre-Dame depicted Quasimodo and Esmeralda.

Despite his success in Paris, Brion remained deeply attached to his native Alsace, and the annexation of the region by Germany after the Franco-Prussian War in 1871 was a personal loss for him. He died on 3 November 1877 at the age of 53.

Brion was a grandnephew of Friederike Brion, the muse of Goethe’s early poetry.

== Principal works ==
The following are his principal works:

Paintings

- Interior of a Farm at Dambaoh, Salon, 1847
- 'Schlitteurs' of the Black Forest, Salon, 1853
- Potato Harvest during an Inundation, Salon, 1852
- Wood-Barge on the Rhine (engraved by Jazet), Paris Exhibition, 1855
- Burial in the Vosges, Paris Exhibition, 1855
- La Fête-Dieu, Paris Exhibition, 1855
- The Miraculous Well, Paris Exhibition, 1855
- Mountebank in the Middle Ages, Salon, 1857
- Gathering Potatoes (in the Nantes Museum), Salon, 1857
- A Church Porch, Salon, 1859
- Burial on the Rhine, Salon, 1859
- The Skittle-Players, Salon, 1859
- A Protestant Marriage in Alsace (etched by Rajon), Salon, 1861
- The Wedding Feast (etched by Bellin), Salon, 1861
- The Blessing, London Exhibition, 1862
- The Pilgrims of St. Odile, Salon, 1863
- The End of the Deluge, Salon, 1864
- La Quète au Loup, Salon, 1864
- Reading the Bible in Alsace, Salon, 1868
- A Wedding in Alsace, Salon, 1874 (earlier drawing of the same image pictured)
- First Steps, Salon 1876
- The Réveil, Encampment of Pilgrims, Salon, 1877

Book illustrations

- Les Misérables, by Victor Hugo (Paris: Pagnerre, 1862), first illustrated edition, with character portraits by Brion
- Notre-Dame de Paris (The Hunchback of Notre-Dame), by Victor Hugo (Paris: J. Hetzel, 1864), illustrated by Brion; engravings by Yon and Perrichon
