= Édouard Pail =

French painter

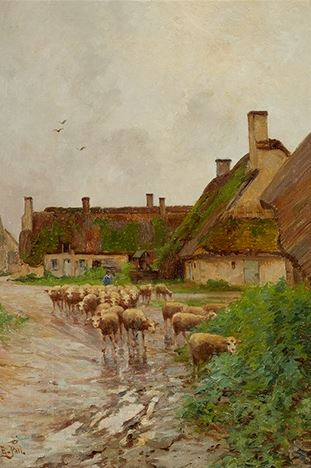
The Departure of the Flock

Édouard Pail (17 October 1851, Corbigny - 6 December 1916, Villeneuve-le-Roi) was a French landscape and animal painter; primarily of sheep.

== Biography ==
His father was a painter from Piémont, and his mother was a native of Corbigny. His initial studies were with a local painter and engraver, Hippolyte Lavoignat, a friend of Camille Corot. Later, he studied at the School of Fine Arts in Nevers. His first exhibition came in 1870, with two landscapes he presented at the Salon. He became a teacher in Nevers in 1877, but left there to return to Paris in 1880.

During the 1880s, he travelled extensively; to England, Egypt, Palestine and Algeria, where he was married in 1886. He then settled permanently in Paris, although he paid visits to Corbigny every summer. His exhibits at the Salon were an annual event, and he became a member there in 1888; winning a medal in 1893. In 1896, he was named a member of the Académie française.

His canvases were primarily landscapes of the areas around Nivernais, in the style of the École de Crozant, with which he was associated. He was a great enthusiast for painting en plein aire. many of his colors give an impression of mistiness.

His works may be seen at the Musée des beaux-arts de Brest, Musée d'art et d'histoire Romain-Rolland, Musée d'art Roger-Quilliot and the Musée Hyacinthe-Rigaud.

== Sources ==
- Lydia Harambourg, Dictionnaire des peintres paysagistes français au xixe siècle, Ides et Calendes, 1985 ISBN 978-2-8258-0014-0
- Christophe Rameix, L’École de Crozant : Les peintres de la Creuse et de Gargilesse. 1850-1950, Éditions Lucien Souny, 1991-2002 ISBN 978-2-911551-87-1
- Marion Vidal-Bué, Les Peintres de l’autre rive, Alger 1830-1930, Cannes, Musée de la Castre, 2003.
- Guy Marin, Jeanne Reimbolte, élève de Edouard Pail à Saint-Honoré-les-Bains, 2014 ISBN 978-2-9533974-9-9
