= Alfred Philippe Roll =

French painter (1846–1919)

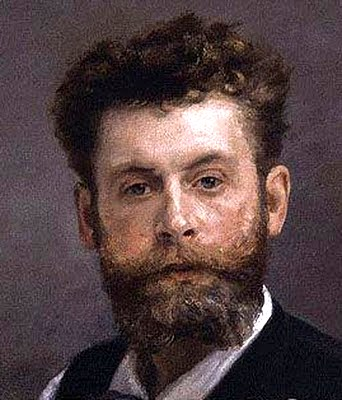
- self portrait
- Born: 1 March 1846; Paris, France
- Died: 27 October 1919 (aged 73); Paris, France
- Known for: Painting, Drawing
- Movement: Realist visual arts

Alfred Philippe Roll (1 March 1846 – 27 October 1919) was a French painter.

== Career ==
Roll studied at École des Beaux-Arts, where he was taught by Jean-Léon Gérôme, Henri-Joseph Harpignies, Charles-François Daubigny and Léon Bonnat. He painted his first landscape in 1869, and in 1870 exhibited "Environs of Baccarat" and "Evening" at Salon-de-Provence. During the Franco-Prussian War, he was a lieutenant of militia.

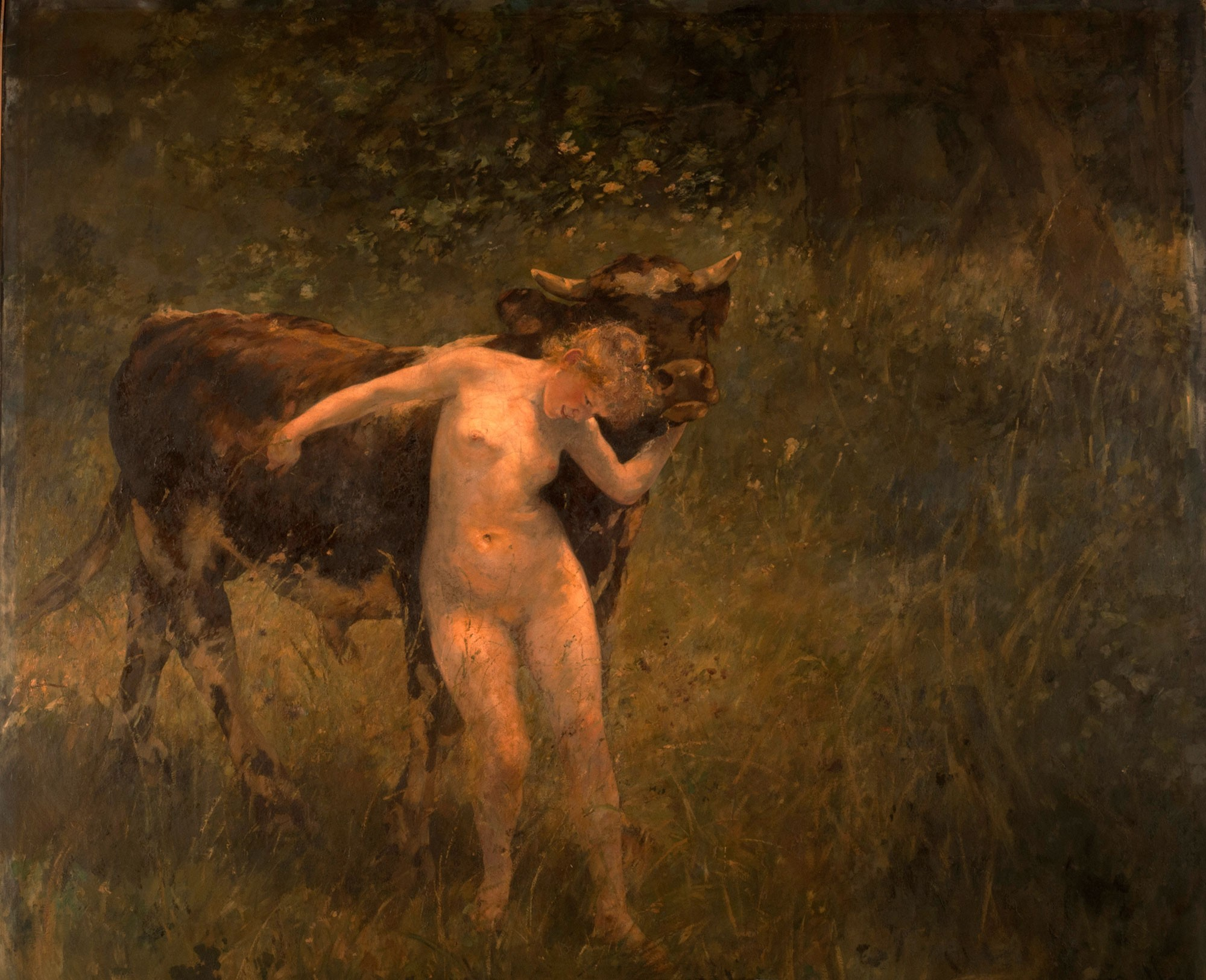
Femme et taureau - Alfred Philippe Roll

His 1875 painting of "The Flood at Toulouse" attracted huge attention, and it is now in the Musée Malraux (Le Havre). All of his early work was romantic style, but was influenced by other styles including Bolognese and Gustave Courbet. In 1877 he exhibited Fete of Silenus at Salon, which is now at the Ghent Museum. It was at this point Roll decided to devote his work to painting everyday life, and his style changed as well to a more realist one.

He began to paint portraits, and with his 1880 painting Miner's Strike, he became one of France's highest ranked painters of the day; he was extremely successful for the rest of his working life. He became an official painter of the French Government. and was commissioned to paint numerous art pieces, including those of murals, ceilings, and other building decoration. President Carnot at Versailles at the Centenary of the Etats Generaux, now at Versailles Palace, and The Tzar and President Faure laying the Foundation Stone of the Alexandre III Bridge are two such paintings, and The Pleasures of Life and The Rosetime of Youth were both for the Hotel de Ville. Many of his paintings are in public art galleries, including the Hotel de Ville museum, the Cognac Museum, Avignon Museum, Laval Museum, Fontainebleau Palace, Pau Museum, and the Museum of Geneva. In 1905 he became the president of the Societe Nationale des Beaux-Arts, which he co-founded. Jules Ernest Renoux was one of his pupils.

In the 1880s Roll "discovered" the Bordeaux artist Alfred Smith, a painter in the style of Courbet and Corot, promoting Smith's work and helping him in his career.

== Gallery ==
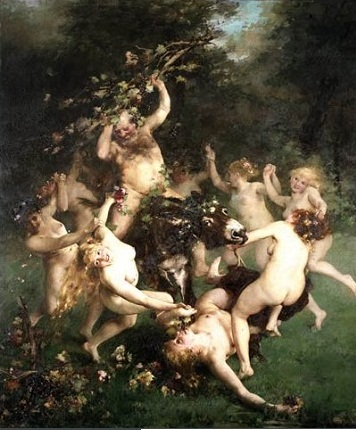
Le Triomphe de Silène (1871), Musée des Beaux-Arts de Gand

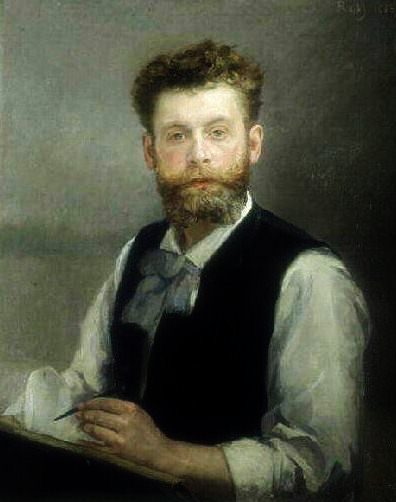
Autoportrait (vers 1875), Musée des Beaux-Arts de Bordeaux

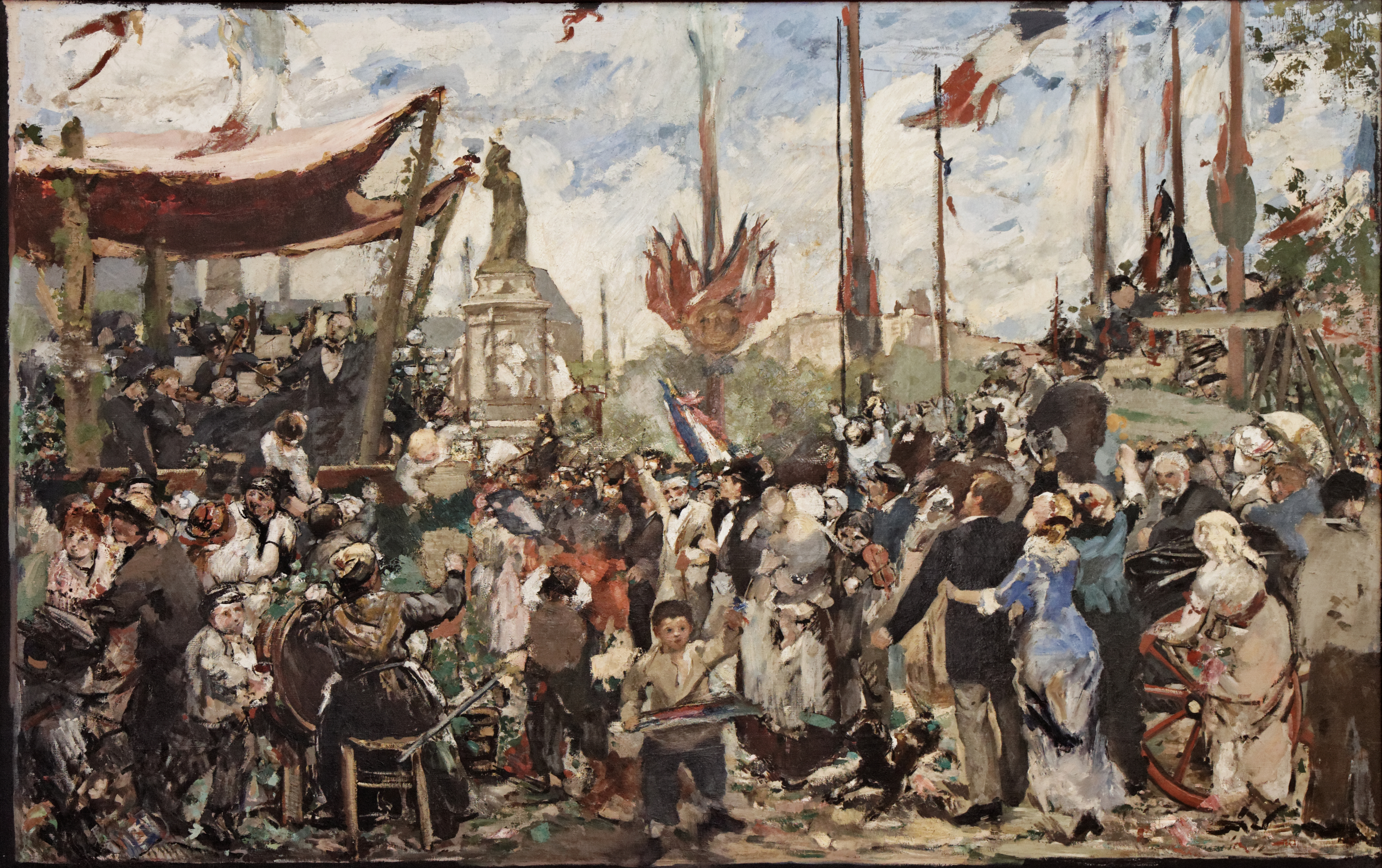
Le 14 juillet 1880, inauguration du monument à la République (vers 1882), Petit Palais, Paris

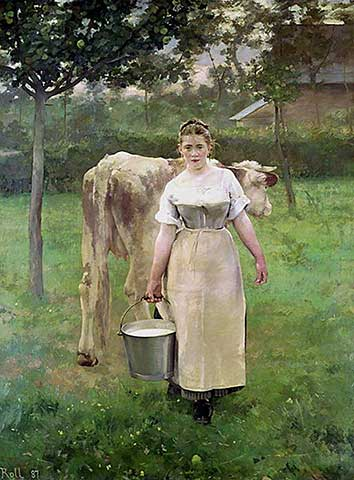
Manda Lamétrie, fermière (1887), Musée d'Orsay.

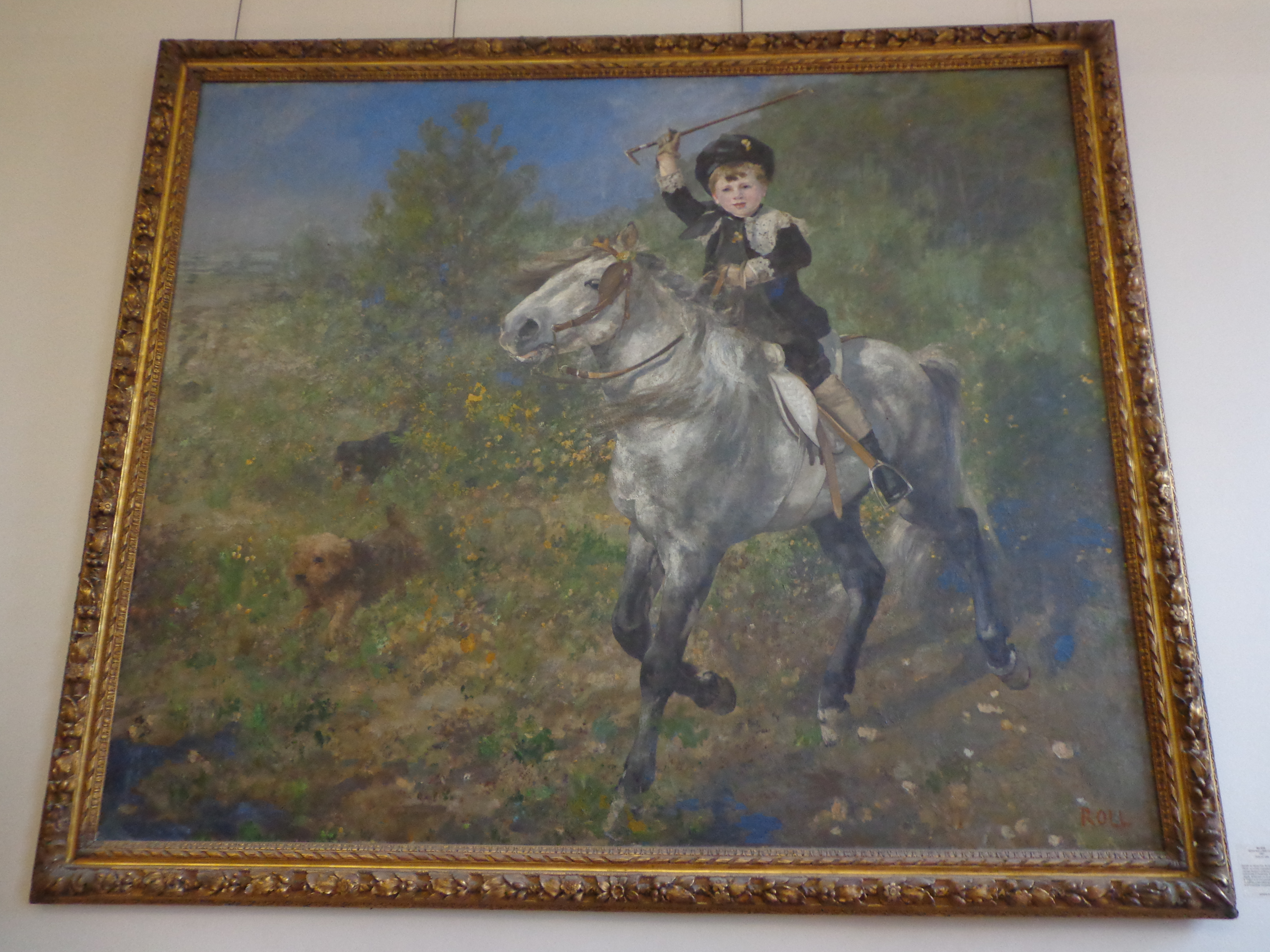
Au Trot (1888), Municipal Museum, Saverne. One of Roll's largest paintings, measuring nearly 3 m (9.8 ft) by 2 m (6 ft 7 in).

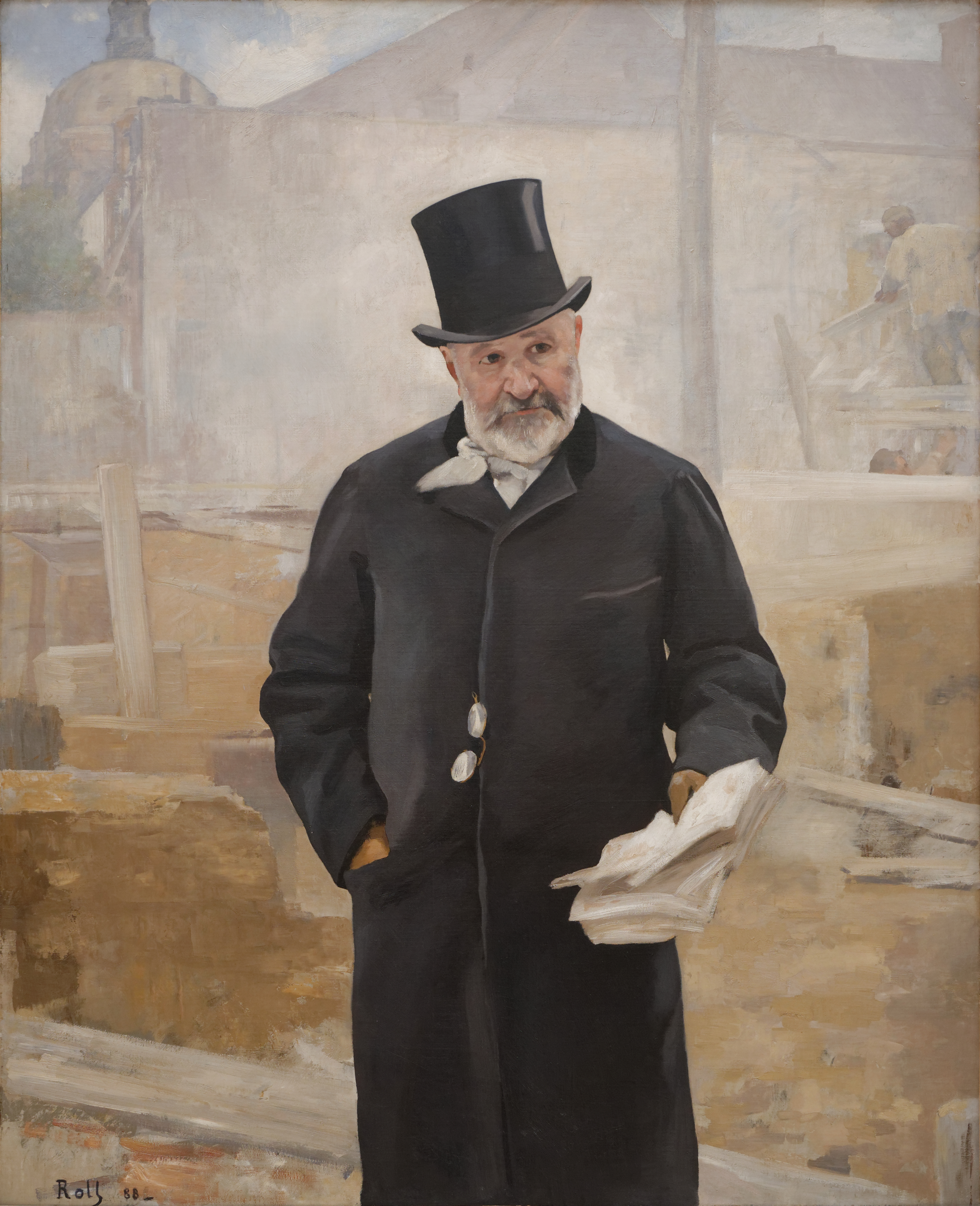
Portrait de Adolphe Alphand (1888), Petit Palais

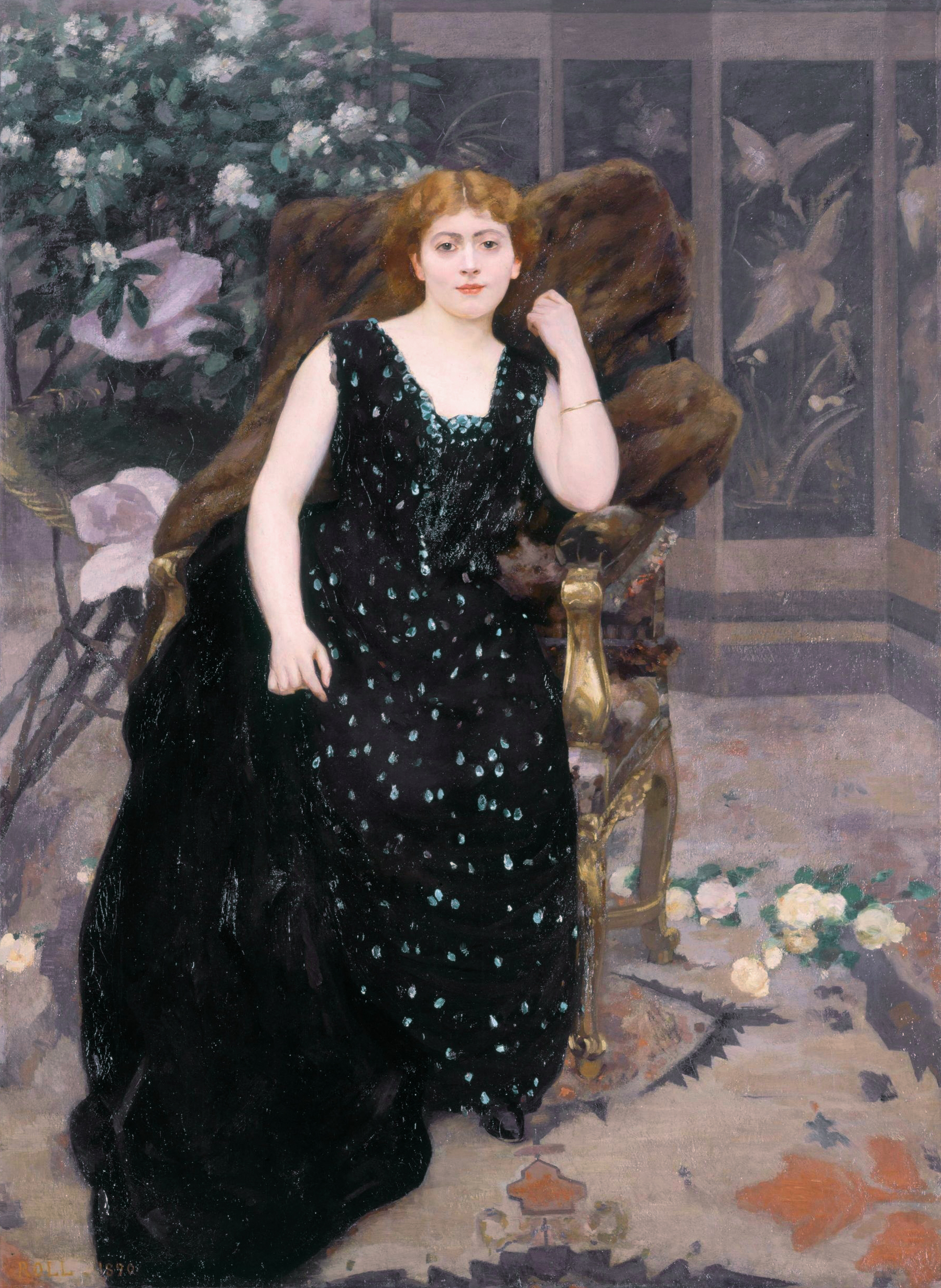
Jane Hading (1890), Petit Palais

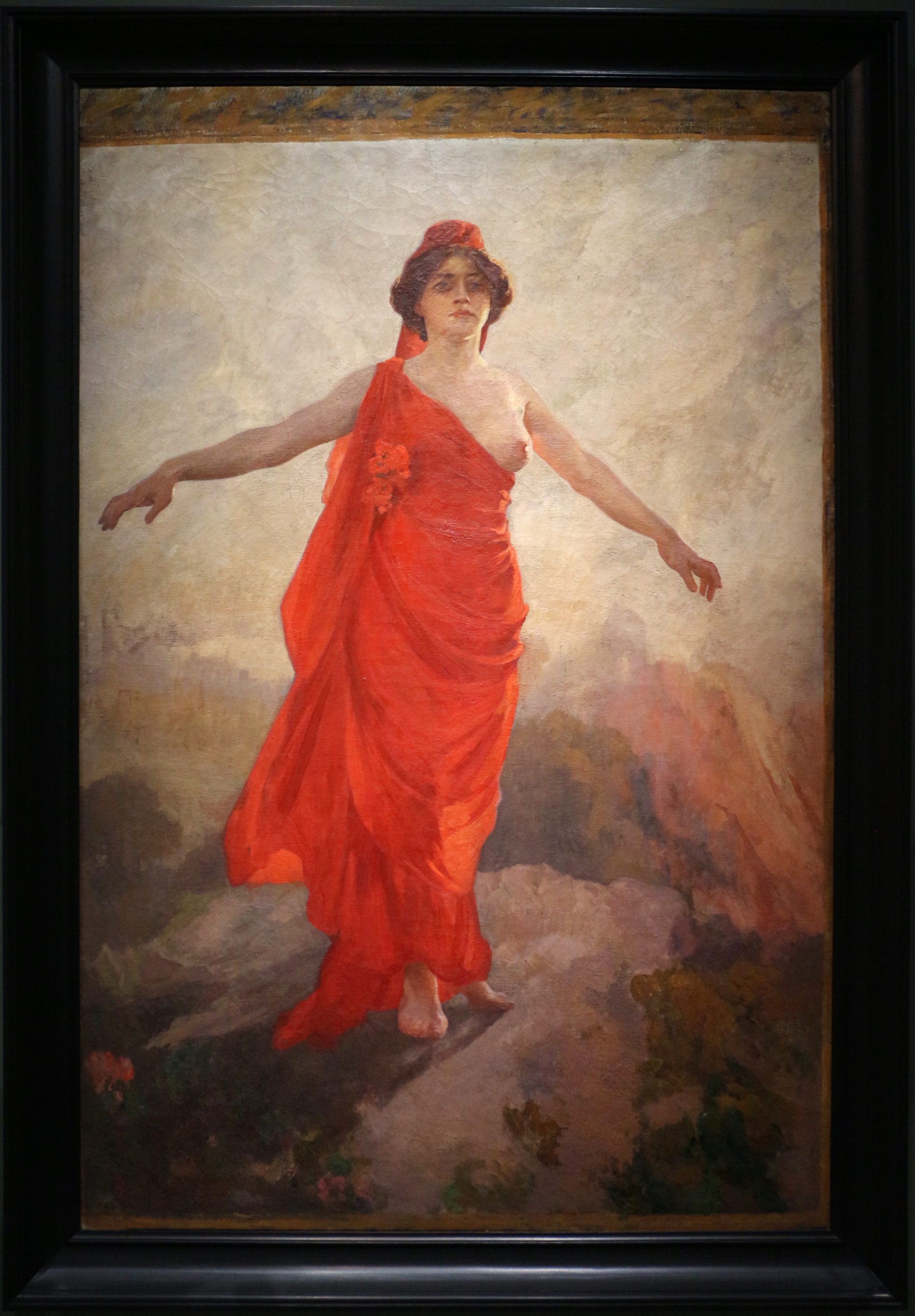
The Young Republic (1908), Musée d’Orsay
