= Armand Cassagne =

French painter (1823–1907)

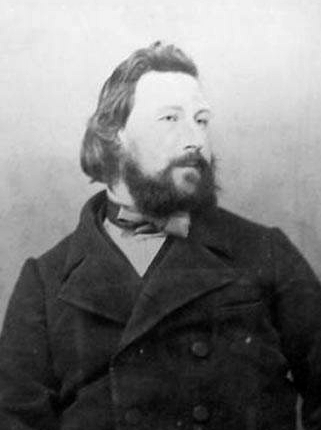
Armand Cassagne (1860s)

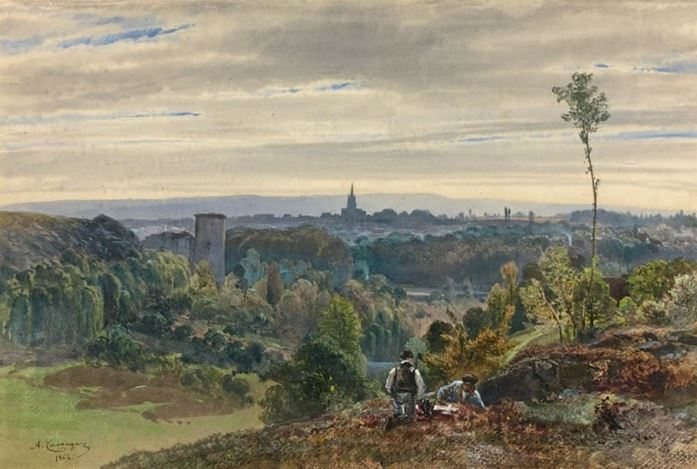
Castle Keep of William the Conqueror, near Dieppe

Armand-Théophile Cassagne (3 May 1823, Le Landin - 5 June 1907, Fontainebleau) was a French painter, watercolorist, lithographer, and writer; associated with the Barbizon School.

== Biography ==
He studied with the English painter and lithographer, James Duffield Harding, who influenced his depictions of trees and foliage. His favorite place to work was in the Forest of Fontainebleau, where he created over three hundred watercolors and paintings.

In 1847, he was appointed a researcher and file clerk at the Municipal Court in Rouen. It was there, in the city library, that he studied the local manuscripts and art collections, under the guidance of the miniaturist, Théodore Basset de Jolimont, who was then serving as Librarian.

He went to Paris in 1852. There, he met Eugène Viollet-le-Duc, and became his student in 1857. That same year, he had his first showing at the Salon. He would continue to exhibit there and at other venues in Paris until 1894. During those years, in addition to Fontainebleau, he worked in Barbizon, the valleys near Chevreuse, the mountains around Grenoble, and along the Rhine. Until 1868, he taught a course in drawing at Fontainebleau. In 1889, he was awarded the Ordre des Palmes académiques for his watercolors.

In addition to his paintings, he was the author of textbooks on painting, including a "Treatise on Watercolors" (1877) and a "Treatise on Perspective, Applied to Artistic and Industrial Design" (1884).

In 1904, he donated most of his art collection to the city of Melun. In 1905, he began to suffer from "congestion", and died in 1907. A street in Melun was named for him. His works may be seen at the Musée d'Évreux, the Musée Municipal des Beaux-Arts de Melun, and the Musée d'Art Moderne et Contemporain de Strasbourg.

== Sources ==
- Benezit Dictionary of Artists, Vol.3
- Obituary in L'Abeille de Fontainebleau, 7 June 1907
- Gérald Schurr and Pierre Cabanne, Dictionnaire des Petits Maîtres de la peinture, 1820-1920, Les Éditions de l'Amateur, Paris, 2008 ISBN 978-2-85917-469-9
- Annie-Claire Lussiez, Armand Cassagne un peintre, un collectionneur, Musée de Melun, 1996 ISBN 978-2-901403-26-5
