= Louis-Augustin Auguin =

French painter (1824–1903)

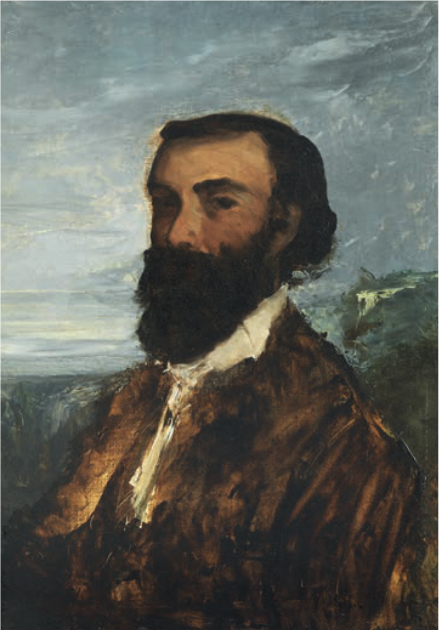
Courbet's portrait of Auguin, 1862, now in the musée Courbet in Ornans

Louis-Augustin Auguin (29 May 1824 – 30 July 1903) was a French landscape and seascape painter of the Saintonge school.

== Biography ==
Born in Rochefort, Charente-Maritime, he initially studied under his father and uncle, both painters. He then moved to Paris in 1842 to study under Jules Coignet and Jean-Baptiste Corot.

He moved back to his birthplace in 1849 in the aftermath of the 1848 Revolution. There, he trained others in drawing and painting and improved his own skills, influenced by the naturalism of Corot and Gustave Courbet, both of whom stayed in Saintes in 1862 and 1863. Corot, Courbet, Auguin and Hippolyte Pradelles (one of Auguin's friends) formed the Port-Berteau Group in 1862 and together they exhibited 170 works to the public on 15 January the following year at the Hôtel de Ville in Saintes. The group then broke up, with Auguin and Pradelles moving to Bordeaux, where they both later died.
