= Gabriel-Christophe Guérin =

French painter (1790–1846)

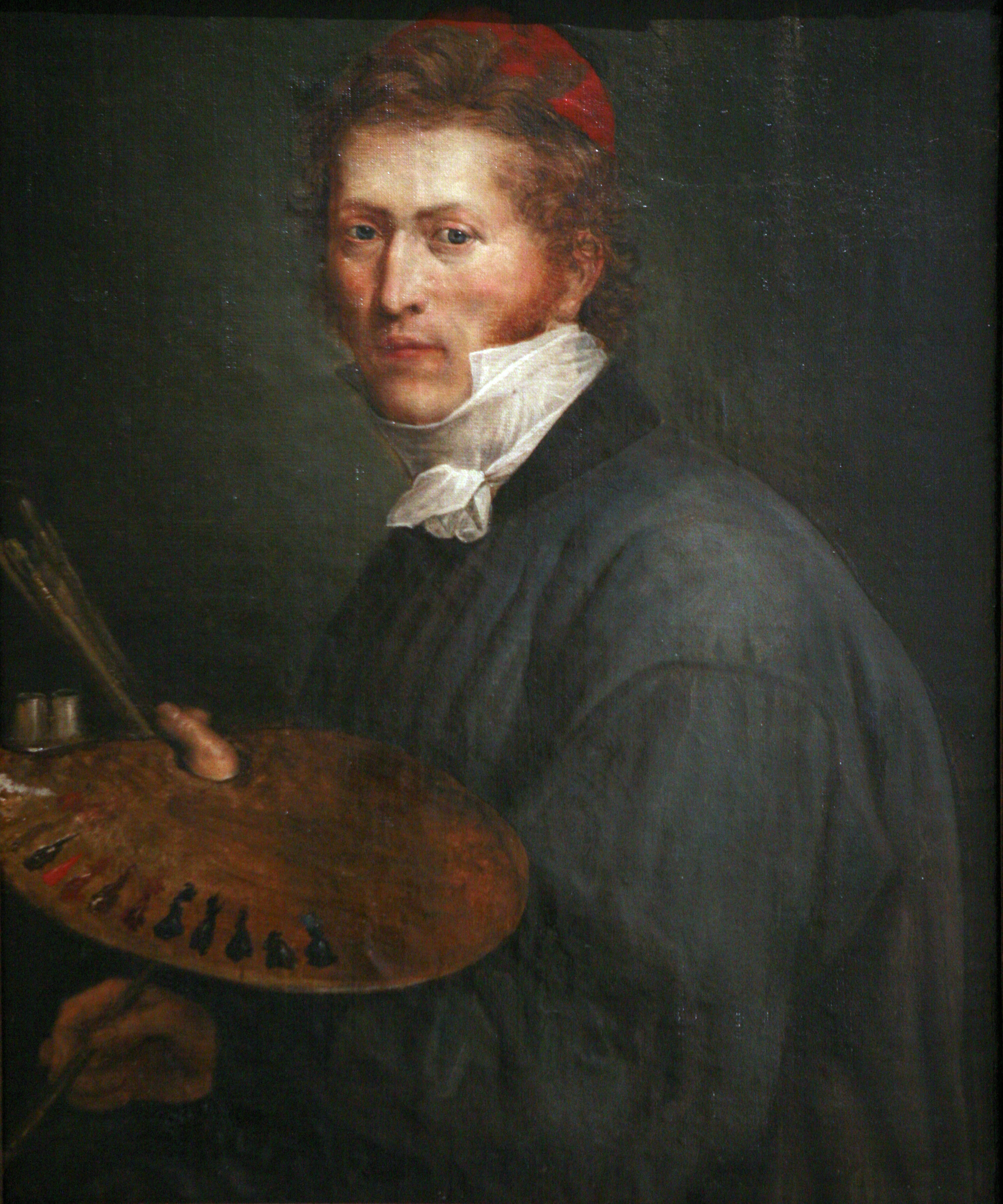
A self-portrait of Guérin

Gabriel-Christophe Guérin (French pronunciation: [ɡabʁijɛl kʁistɔf ɡeʁɛ̃]; 9 November 1790 – 20 September 1846) was a 19th-century portraitist and history painter. He was born in Kehl and died in Hornbach in Rhenish Bavaria. He studied under Jean-Baptiste Regnault and his pupils included Hippolyte Pradelles.

He came from a major French artistic family - his grand-father Jean and his father Christophe were both engravers, his uncle Jean Urbain was a miniaturist and his brother Jean-Baptiste was a painter. He is buried in the cimetière Sainte-Hélène in Strasbourg alongside Jean, Christophe and his son Valérie - the tomb monument is by André Friedrich.
