= Henri Charrier =

French painter (1859–1950)

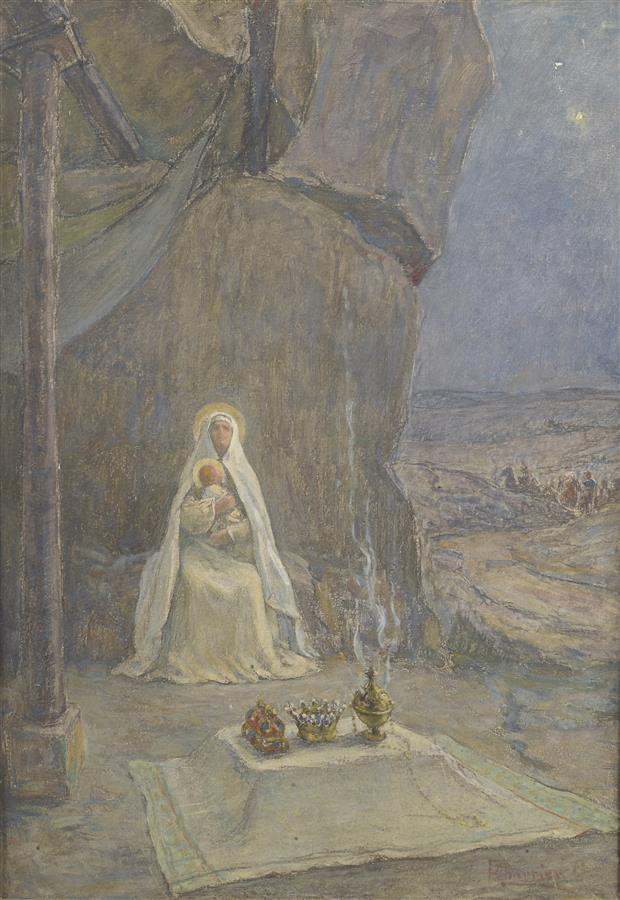
The Gifts of the Magi

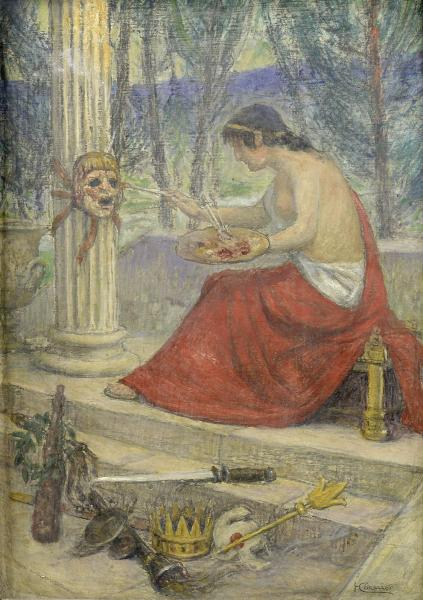
The Greek Muse

Henri Georges Charrier (19 September 1859, Paris – 6 January 1950, Paris) was a French painter; best known for his works in tempera, many of which feature scenes from mythology and nudes.

== Biography ==
He was a student of Jean-Paul Laurens and Joseph Blanc. His debut at the Salon came in 1881, and he was elected a member of the Société des artistes français in 1892. Two years later, he was awarded a third-class medal at the Salon. In 1933, he was named a Knight in the Legion of Honor.

Much of his work was done in the vicinity of Creuse, but he also travelled to Brittany, Auvergne and Allier, as well as providing decorations for several churches in Normandy. These included large, mounted paintings at the church of Saint Stephen in Fécamp, and monumental frescoes, depicting the Assumption, at the main church in Fauville. He also worked at the church of Saint Vincent in Charonne, and at a private location in Perros-Guirec.

His discovery of tempera (water-based paint with egg white) gave his works more subtle, delicate shades, and led him to gradually abandon painting with oils. He also researched various methods of fresco painting, which was then enjoying a vogue.

After his death, the Salon d'hiver organized a major retrospective of his works. They may be seen at the Louvre, and in museums in Guéret, Lille, Poitiers, Pontoise, and Quimper.

== Sources ==
- René Édouard-Joseph, Dictionnaire biographique des artistes contemporains, Vol.1, A-E, Art & Édition, 1930, pp. 278–279
- Christophe Rameix, L'École de Crozant, ed.Lucien Souny, 1991 ISBN 978-2-911551-87-1
- Emmanuel Bénézit, Dictionnaire des peintres, sculpteurs dessinateurs et graveurs, ed.Gründ, 1976.
- Marie-Hélène Desjardins, "Les peintures de l'église Saint-Étienne de Fécamp - Deuxième partie : Henri-Georges Charrier", in: Annales du Patrimoine de Fécamp, #19, 2012
