= Eugène Alluaud =

French painter, ceramist and illustrator

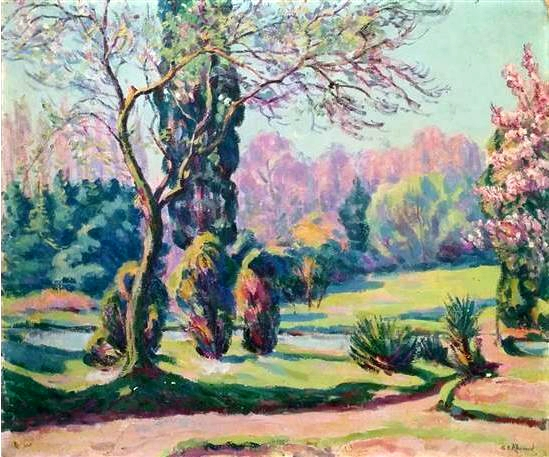
Spring (Park) Landscape

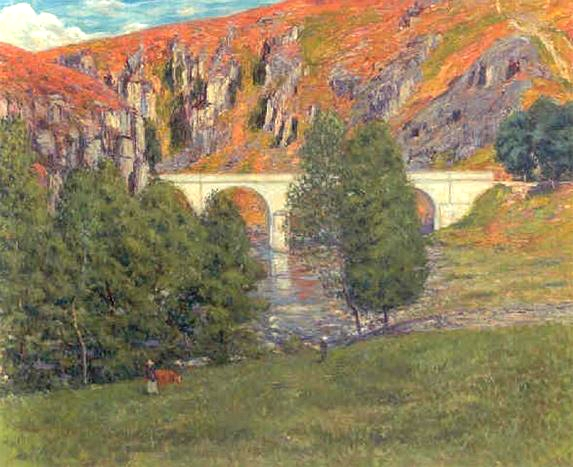
Mountain Landscape with Bridge

Gilbert Eugène Alluaud (25 March 1866 in Saint-Martin-Terressus – 27 July 1947 in Crozant) was a French landscape painter and ceramicist.

== Biography ==
He was born to a family of porcelainiers, dating back several generations. His great-grandfather, François (1739-1799), was Director of the Royal Porcelain Manufactory in Limoges. His grandfather, also named François, worked at Limoges and was a noted geologist. His brother, Charles, broke with family tradition to become an entomologist.

In 1897, he was able to purchase a small manufactory in Limoges, where he created monumental porcelain pieces. Some of them were awarded a gold medal at the Exposition Universelle (1900). Despite this success, increasing production costs forced him into bankruptcy in 1903. Shortly after, Charles Edward Haviland took him into his workshop to manage the decoration process. By 1919, he was able to re-establish a workshop of his own, in Solignac, where he specialized in luxury jars for perfumes.

During these years, he helped to create several organizations devoted to promoting Limoges porcelain. In 1921, he was named a Knight in the Legion of Honor. He was appointed Conservator of the Musée national de la porcelaine Adrien-Dubouché in 1928, and held that position until 1934.

In conjunction with these activities, he was always interested in art; inspired by his father, Amédée (1825-1872), an amateur collector who helped support the group of artists known as the Crozant School. This interest was reinforced when he became friends with the painter, Jules Adler, during his mandatory military service (1885-1886). Immediately after, he enrolled at the Académie Julian, where he studied with William Bouguereau and Tony Robert-Fleury. After graduating, in 1889, he took a study trip to England, Belgium, Italy and North Africa.

He made his first, brief visit to Crozant in 1887. A longer stay followed in 1891. By 1905, he and his wife, Marcelle, had built a home there, called "La Roca", where they stayed every summer. It soon became a gathering point for the artists' colony. His best friends there included the poet, Maurice Rollinat, and the Impressionist painter Armand Guillaumin, who was a major influence on his middle-period style. Later, he would be more influenced by Cézanne. He was regular exhibitor at the Salon d'Automne.

His works may be seen at museums in Châteauroux, Guéret and Limoges.
