= Lacour (disambiguation) =

Lacour or LaCour may refer to:

== Places ==
- Lacour, commune in southern France
- Lacour, Louisiana, community in the U.S.
- Lacour-d'Arcenay, commune in eastern France

== People ==
- Paul-Armand Challemel-Lacour (1827-1896), French statesman
- Josephine White deLacour (1849-1929), American physician, suffragist
- Alice Vassar LaCour (1870s – 1924), American educator, singer
- Edmund G. LaCour Jr. (born 1985), American lawyer
- Fred LaCour (1938-1972), American professional basketball player
- Georges Lacour-Gayet (1856-1935), French historian
- Guillaume Lacour (born 1980), French former professional footballer
- Guy Lacour (1932-2013), French composer
- Joan LaCour Scott (1921-2012), American trade union activist, screenwriter
- José-André Lacour (1919-2005), Belgian novelist, playwright, translator, screenwriter, director
- Lenny LaCour (born 1932), American record producer, songwriter
- Léopold Lacour (1854–1939), French teacher, sociologist, writer, feminist
- Marcelle de Lacour (1896-1997), French harpsichordist, teacher
- Nina LaCour, American author
- Noélie Annette Lacour (born 2006), Gabonese swimmer
- Pierre Lacour (1745-1814), French painter
- Pierre Lacour (the younger) (1778-1859), French painter, engraver
- Quentin Lacour (born 1993), French professional footballer
- Reginald B. DeLacour (1886-1948), Adjutant General of the State of Connecticut, U.S.
- Robert Lacour-Gayet (1896-1989), French banking official, historian, author, educator
- Rolf Lacour (1937-2018), German wrestler
- Stéphanie P. Lacour (born c. 1975), French neurotechnologist
- Marie Léopold-Lacour (1859-1942), French feminist activist, journalist, writer
