= Leocadia Zorrilla =

Companion of Francisco Goya

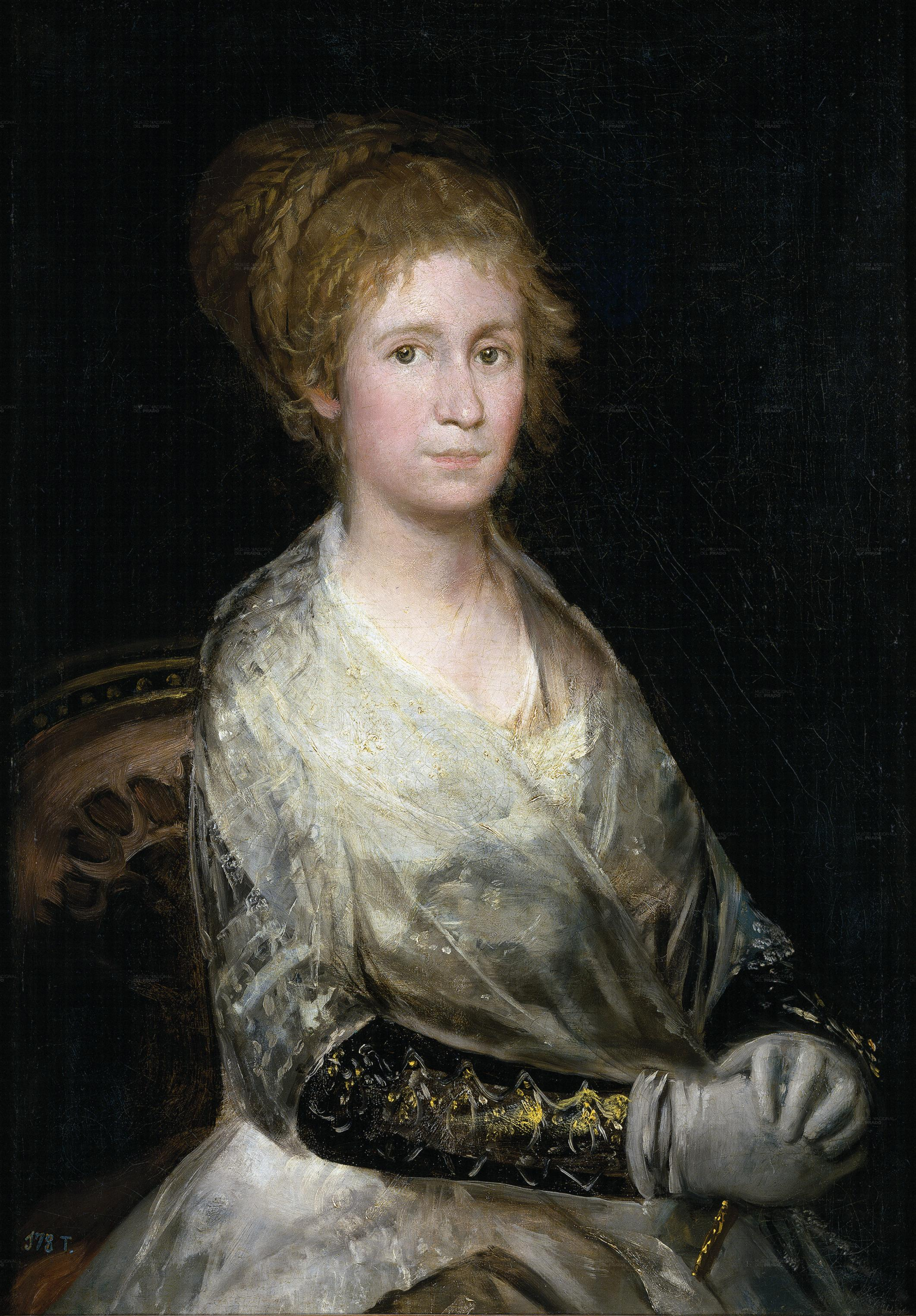
Probable portrait of Zorrilla, Goya c. 1815. Formerly identified as his wife, Josefa Bayeu

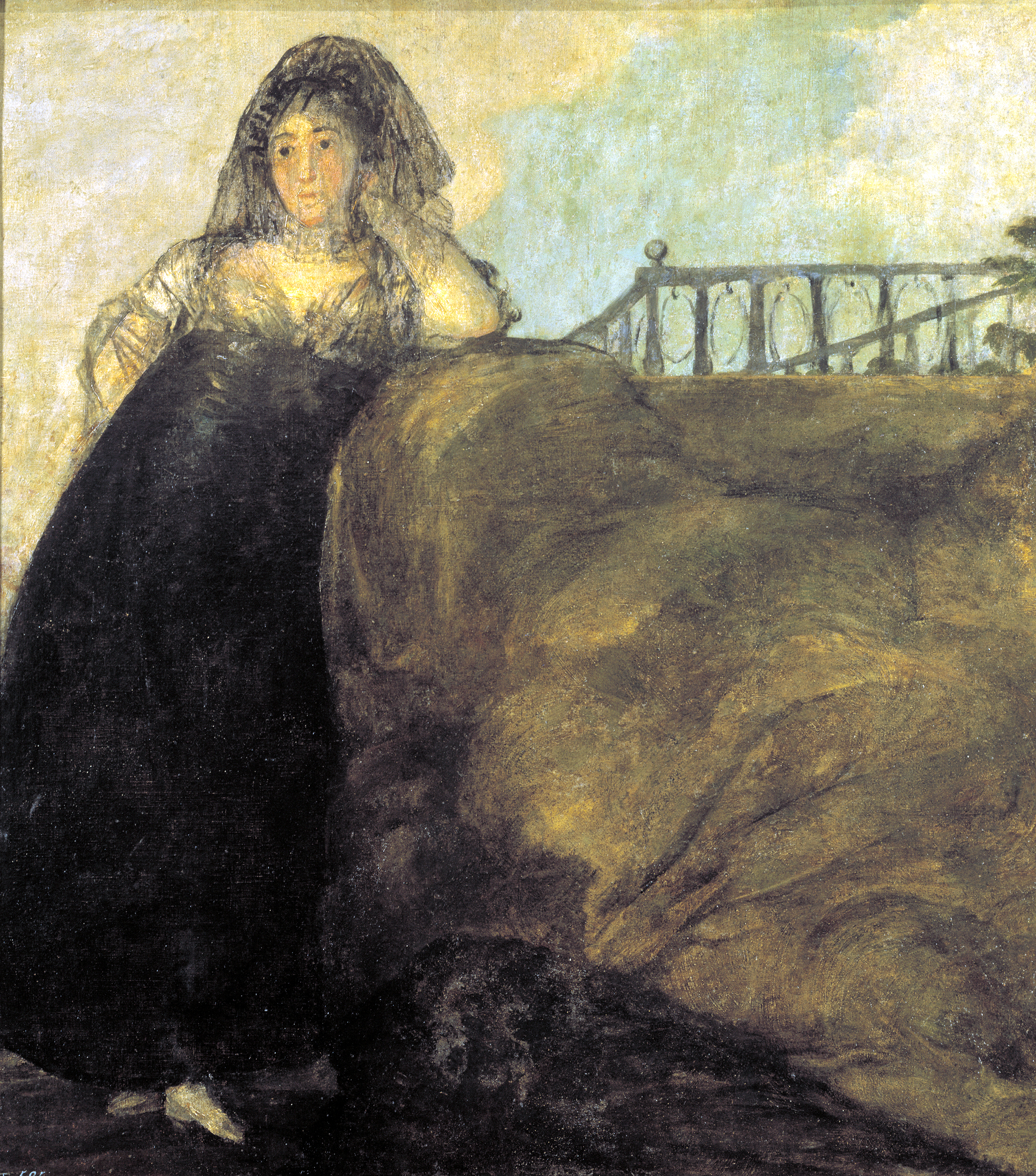
La Leocadia, Goya, c. 1819–1823

Leocadia Zorrilla, married name Leocadia Weiss (9 December 1788, Madrid – 7 August 1856, Madrid), was the old-age companion of Spanish painter Francisco Goya, and mother of the artist Rosario Weiss Zorrilla.

== Life ==
Leocadia was orphaned at an early age and her education was provided by her aunt, Juana Galarza. Much of her early life is presumed, rather than known. She apparently met Goya in 1805, at the wedding of his son, Javier, to her cousin, Gumersinda Goicoechea Galarza. In 1807, Leocadia married Isidore Weiss, a Jewish-German jeweler whose family lived in Madrid, and they settled into his parents' home. While living there, she gave birth to two children: Joaquín (1808) and Guillermo (1811). However, in 1811, Weiss had sworn out a legal document accusing her of "illicit conduct", and they separated. Leocadia gave birth to a third child, Rosario, in 1814. Speculation has focused on the possibility of Goya as Rosario's father. This has not been firmly established, but it appears certain that Weiss was not the father. In 1817, together with her two younger children, Leocadia moved in with Goya, who had been widowed in 1812; ostensibly to be his housekeeper.

In 1824, Leocadia was compelled to leave Madrid for Bayonne, as her son, Guillermo, had become involved in the revolutionary activities of Francisco Espoz y Mina. Goya, disillusioned by political events in Spain, left for Paris at the same time. The two were reunited in Bordeaux, which was home to many Spanish exiles. Although Leocadia had a fiery, restless temperament and Goya had become rather feeble, they appeared to enjoy each other's company and were often seen in public together.

Her letters are the only record of the final days leading up to Goya's death in 1828. Goya did not include Leocadia in his will, which left her in a rather precarious financial state. Javier, one of Goya's sons, allowed Leocadia to keep his father's furniture and provided her with some money. It is not known how Isidore, Leocadia's former husband, responded to Goya's death, although he had claimed paternity for Rosario. Despite Javier's apparent generosity, Leocadia's letters indicate that the following five years were difficult and that she survived largely by virtue of a pension from the French government.

Following a general amnesty in 1833, she and Rosario returned to Madrid. By then, the money that Javier de Goya had given them had run out. They supported themselves on what Rosario was able to earn by copying and selling works of the Old Masters at the Museo del Prado. In 1840, Rosario was accepted at the Real Academia de Bellas Artes de San Fernando and received an appointment as drawing tutor to Princesses Isabel and Luisa Fernanda, receiving a salary of 8,000 Reales. This position was probably obtained by liberal friends of her brother, Guillermo, who knew Agustín Argüelles, Isabel's legal guardian.

In 1843, Rosario, only twenty-eight years old, died suddenly. Leocadia's life after this is unclear, although it is known that she was forced to sell several works of Goya's that she had retained. She died at home in 1856 and was buried in a mass grave at the Parish of San Martín. Her former husband, Isidore, had died apparently in poverty in 1850.

In addition to the oil portrait that was once believed to be of Josefa Bayeu, Leocadia may also be represented in one of Goya's Black Paintings, known as La Leocadia, or The Seductress; and in a late painting, The Milkmaid of Bordeaux. Rosario also made several drawings of her.
