= La Leocadia =

Painting by Francisco de Goya

- Una manola: doña Leocadia Zorrilla (Spanish)
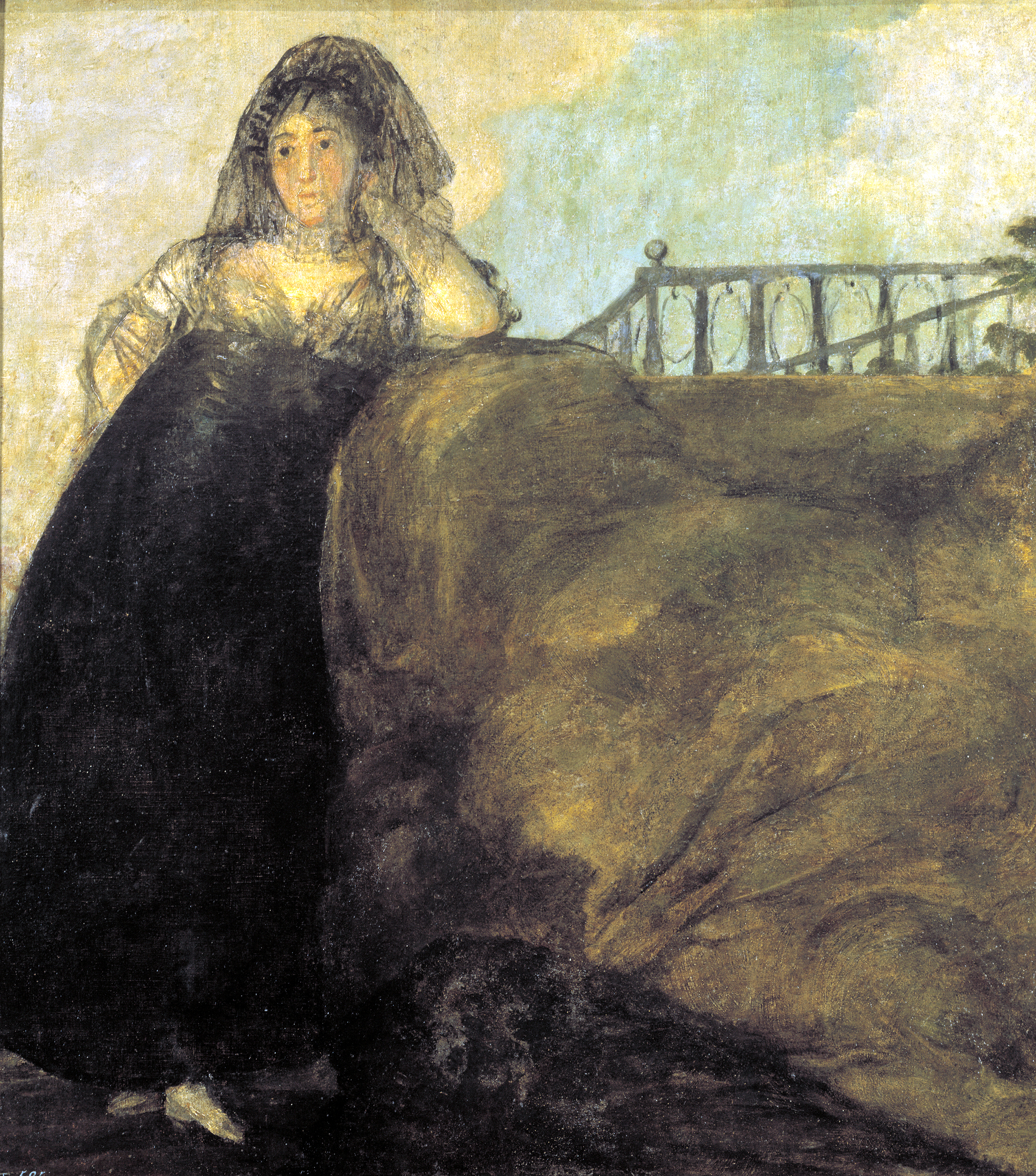
- Artist: Francisco Goya
- Year: c. 1819–1823
- Medium: Oil mural transferred to canvas
- Dimensions: 145.7 cm × 129.4 cm (57.4 in × 50.9 in)
- Location: Museo del Prado, Madrid

La Leocadia (Spanish: Doña Leocadia) or The Seductress (Spanish: Una Manola) are names given to a mural by the Spanish artist Francisco Goya, completed sometime between 1819–1823, as one of his series of 14 Black Paintings. It shows Leocadia Weiss, his maid and likely his lover. She is dressed in a dark, almost funereal maja dress and leans against what is either a mantelpiece or burial mound as she looks outward at the viewer with a sorrowful expression.

La Leocadia was one of the final of the Black Paintings to be completed, a series that he painted, in his seventies at a time when he was consumed by political, physical and psychological turmoil after he fled to the country from his position as court painter in Madrid.

According to the c. 1828–1830 inventory of his friend Antonio Brugada, Leocadia was situated in the ground floor of Quinta del Sordo, Goya's villa which Lawrence Gowing observes was thematically divided: a male side of Saturn Devouring His Son and A Pilgrimage to San Isidro; and a female side compromising Judith and Holofernes, Witches' Sabbath, and Leocadia. All the works in the series were transferred to canvas after Goya's death and are now in the Museo del Prado in Madrid.

== Description ==
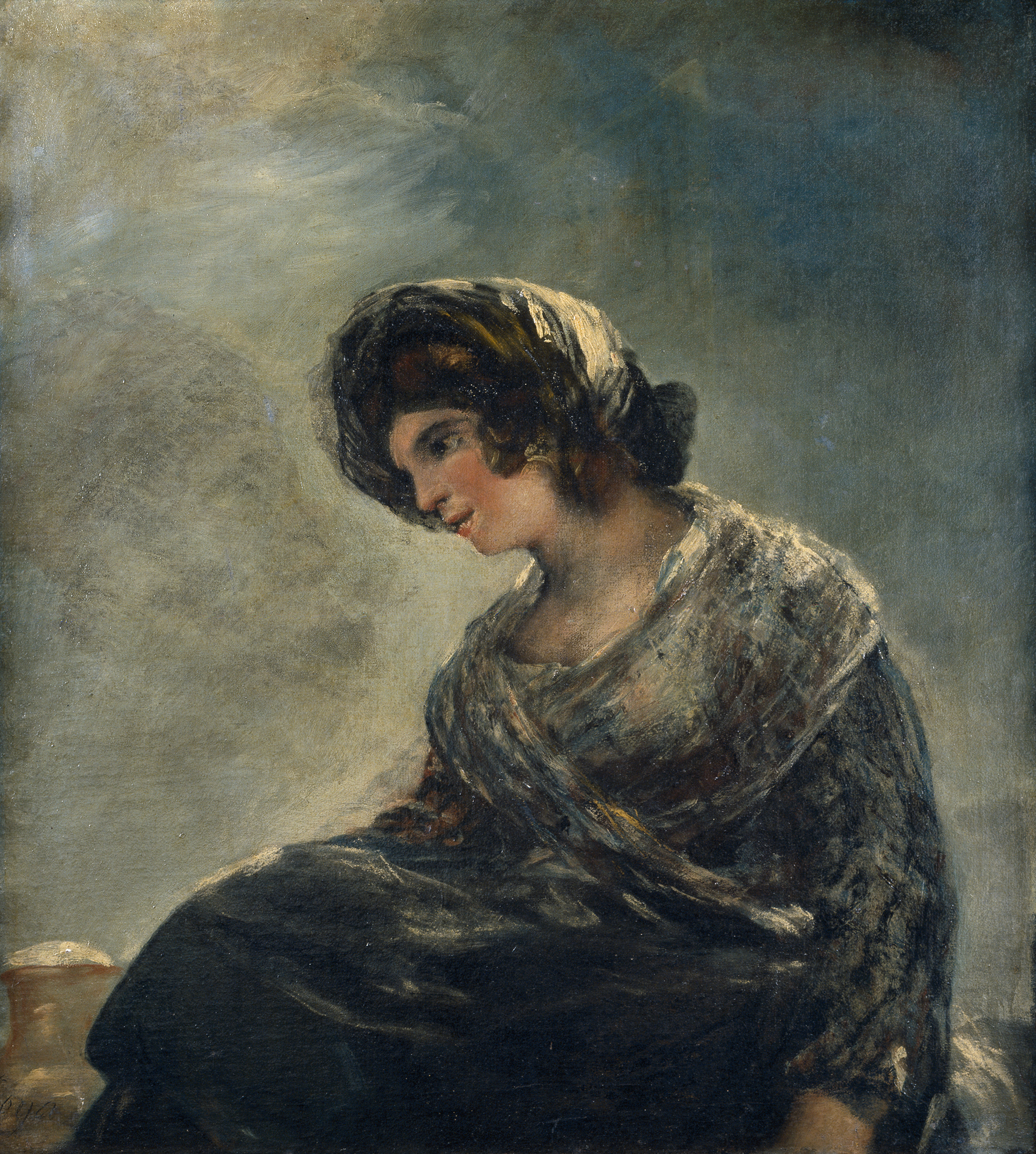
The Milkmaid of Bordeaux, 1825–1827, is the third and final Goya portrait which may depict Leocadia Weiss. This might also be of Leocadia's daughter Rosario. Its colourisation and mood is very similar to the Leocadia Black Painting

The painting's funereal air is established through the shading of the grey background, the colouring of the model's black veil and maja dress, and her sad or nostalgic expression. She is positioned before an open blue sky, with her body slightly leaning against a rock or mound. The mound is topped by a row of small wrought iron rails; some critics have suggested it may represent a burial mound. X-ray shows that the mound may originally have been painted as an open fireplace and the veil a later addition. Leocadia's head rests on her forearm as she looks thoughtfully towards the viewer and is portrayed in a sympathetic manner. The work is illuminated by a yellow light falling on her face, arm and chest. The background shows a blue and white sky emitting an ocher yellowish noon-light reminiscent of one of his final works, The Milkmaid of Bordeaux.

The painting contains a sense of peace and an air of reconciliation absent in the other works from the series. Writer Juan José Junquera wrote that the work may represent a personification of Melancholy, or given the relationship between artist and model, "the symbol of the fire of love and of the home and the presentiment of coming death". According to Robert Havard, her confident stare and maja dress may be indications of the earlier charge against her of adultery.

== Leocadia Weiss ==
As with any of the paintings from the series, the current title was not Goya's own, and he never mentioned or wrote about any of them. The picture probably depicts Leocadia Weiss, (née Zorrilla, 1788–1856) the artist's maid, younger by 35 years and distant relative, although this identity has been contested. Leocadia was probably similarly looking to Goya's first wife Josefa Bayeu, to the extent that one of his well-known portraits bears the (later) cautious title Josefa Bayeu (or Leocadia Weiss). While Junquera describes the identification of Leocadia as "more romantic ... than a certainty", the work bears strong resemblance to a 1805 Goya portrait more or less accepted to be of her, and which was left in her possession following his death.

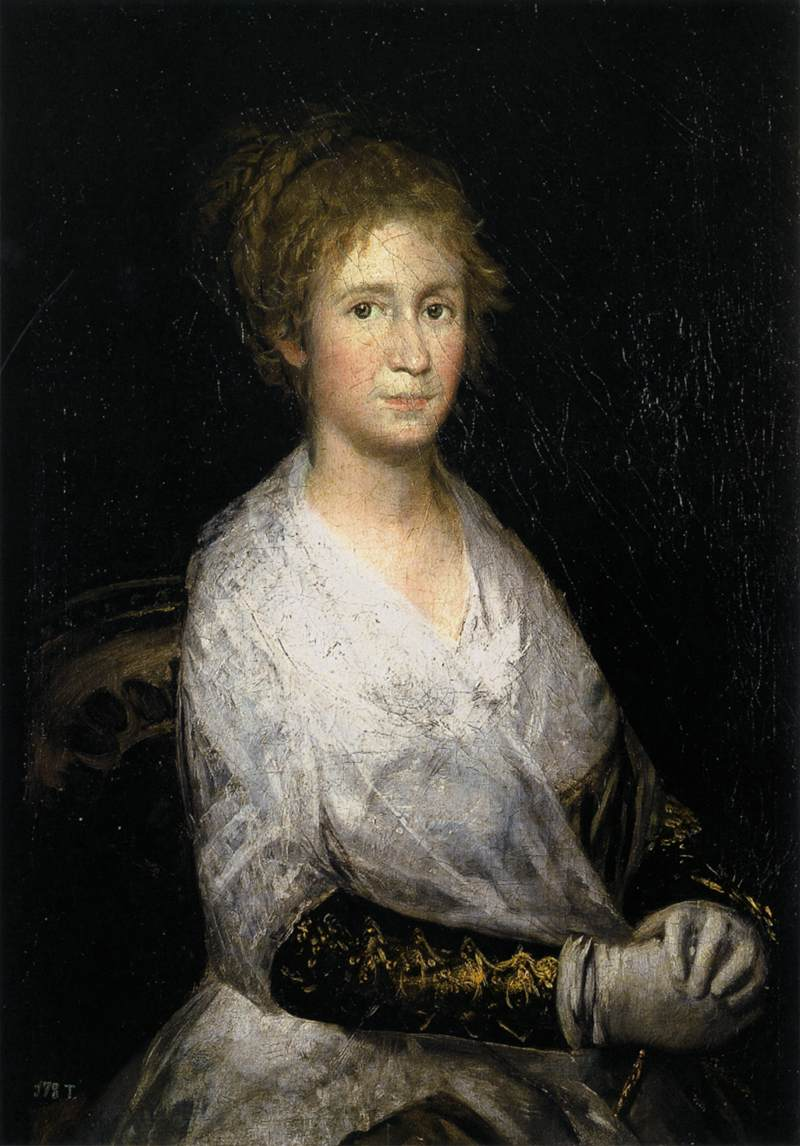
Francisco Goya, It is not known whether this 1805 Goya portrait is of his wife Josefa Bayeu or mistress Leocadia Weiss.

Leocadia and her daughter, Rosario, lived with and cared for Goya after Bayeu's death. She stayed with him in the Quinta del Sordo villa until 1824. Sometime in 1824, Goya lost faith in, or became threatened by, the restored Spanish monarchy's anti-liberal political and social stance and abandoned Spain to live in France until his death in 1828. Leocadia followed him with Rosario and stayed until his death.

Not much is known about her beyond that she had a fiery temperament. It is known that Leocadia had an unhappy marriage with a jeweller, Isidore Weiss, but had been separated from him since 1811 after he had accused her of "illicit conduct". She had two children before that time and bore a third, Rosario, in 1814 when she was 26. Isidore was not the father, and it has often been speculated – although with little firm evidence – that the child belonged to Goya. There has been much speculation that Goya and Weiss were romantically linked, and that in this work, she is shown as his widow mourning at his tomb. Others believe the affection between them was platonic and sentimental.

From her representations it has been assumed that she was striking looking – if not pretty – and probably in her early 30s at the time of this portrait. She had a strong fiery character; based on Goya's letters, her manner often upset him. Despite the sentiment expressed in a letter in which Goya sent her "a thousand kisses and a thousand things", Leocadia was left nothing in his will. Mistresses were often omitted in such circumstances. His son Javier, who inherited a large amount of his father's inventory and unsold paintings, but had refused to visit him in Bordeaux, gave her 1,000 francs and pieces of furniture from the home she had shared with his father. She wrote to a number of his friends to complain of her exclusion and that Javier had stolen silverware and pistols from her home. Unfortunately for her, many of her friends were Goya's and by then old men and had died, or died before they could reply.

In destitution, she moved into rented accommodation, and she passed on her copy of the Caprichos for free. She also sold The Milkmaid of Bordeaux —for which Goya had told her not to accept less than 'one ounce of gold'— to the Count of Mugurino, but the price she received is lost. Her French pension was cut off shortly after. She possessed a number of Goya's drawings, which she auctioned in 1849; however, again, it is unknown how much she received for any of them.

== Bibliography ==
- Buchholz, Elke Linda. Francisco de Goya. Cologne: Könemann, 1999. ISBN 3-8290-2930-6
- Connell, Evan S. Francisco Goya: A Life. New York: Counterpoint, 2004. ISBN 1-58243-307-0
- Gassier, Pierre. Goya: A Biographical and Critical Study. New York: Skira, 1955
- Havard, Robert. "Goya's House Revisited: Why a Deaf Man Painted his Walls Black". Bulletin of Spanish Studies, Volume 82, Issue 5 July 2005. 615 – 639
- Havard, Robert. The Spanish eye: painters and poets of Spain. Tamesis Books, 2007. ISBN 1-85566-143-8
- Heselwood, Julia. Lovers: Portraits by 40 Great Artists. London : Frances Lincoln, 2011. ISBN 978-0-7112-3108-5
- Hughes, Robert. Goya. New York: Alfred A. Knopf, 2004. ISBN 0-394-58028-1
- Junquera, Juan José. The Black Paintings of Goya. London: Scala Publishers, 2008. ISBN 1-85759-273-5
- Licht, Fred. Goya: The Origins of the Modern temper in Art. Universe Books, 1979. ISBN 0-87663-294-0
- Stevenson, Ian. European Cases of the Reincarnation Type. Jefferson, NC: McFarland & Co, 2009. ISBN 0-7864-4249-2
