= Luigi Loir =

French painter, illustrator and lithographer (1845–1916)

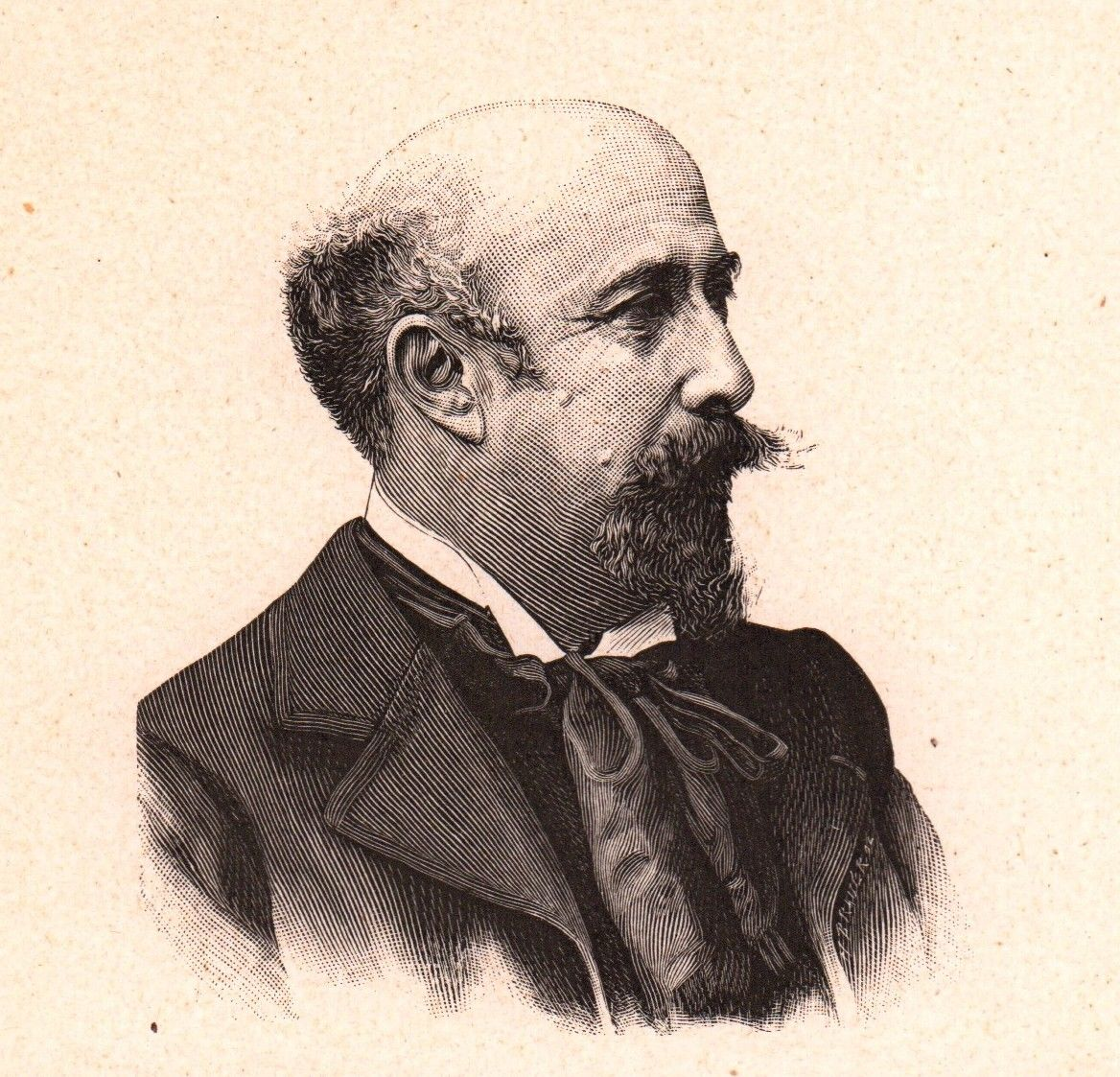
- Luigi Loir
- Born: Luigi Aloys-François-Joseph Loir; 22 December 1845; Goritz, Austrian Empire
- Died: 9 February 1916 (aged 70); Paris, France
- Occupations: Painter; Lithographer

Luigi Loir (22 December 1845 – 9 February 1916) was a French painter, illustrator and lithographer.

== Biography ==
Luigi Loir was born in Goritz, Austria. He was the son of Tancrède Loir François and Thérèse Leban, his wife, respectively valet and housekeeper of the French royal family in exile in Austria. Installed in the duchy of Parma in 1847, Luigi Loir studied at the school of Fine Arts of Parma in 1853. His first known painting is Paysage à Villiers-sur Seine (1865), painted two years after his return to Paris. He was primarily a landscape painter. He also became known for his ceiling paintings and worked with Jean Pastelot (1820–1870).

He realized some drawings for the biscuits brand LU and participated in the battles of Le Bourget during the Franco-Prussian War.

Loir was made a chevalier of the Légion d'honneur in 1898. He died in Paris in 1916.

== Illustrated books ==
- Jules Verne, Voyages extraordinaires, 1882.

== Salons ==
- 1865: Paysages de Parme; Vue de Rome; Vue de Dieppe (gouaches).
- 1879: médaille de troisième classe.
- Salon des artistes français:
  - 1886: médaille de seconde classe;
  - 1889: médaille d'or.

== Works in public collections ==
=== Argentina ===
- Buenos Aires, Museo Nacional de Bellas Artes: Sur le quais de Paris, Francia, Goritz, 1845 – Francia, París, 1916

=== Canada ===
- Montreal Museum of Fine Art: Le Point-du-jour, Auteuil, 1883

=== Czech Republic ===
- Prague, National Gallery: Le Métropolitain, 1899.

=== England ===
- London, Connaught Brown: Quai Bourbon, s.d.

=== France ===
- Bar-le-Duc, Musée Barrois: Avant l'embarquement, effet crépusculaire, 1893.
- Bordeaux, Musée des Beaux-Arts.
- Marseille, Musée des Civilisations de l'Europe et de la Méditerranée: Félicia Mallet in L'Enfant prodigue, chromolithography.
- Paris:
  - Hôtel de ville de Paris:
    - Les Préparatifs de la fête foraine, salle d'honneur du conseil municipal;
    - La Rue de la Pitié vue du Val de Grâce, salon des sciences.
  - Musée Carnavalet: Porte Maillot, effet de neige, la nuit, oil on canvas.
  - Musée d'Orsay.
  - Petit Palais: Le Marché à la ferraille.
- Rouen, Musée des Beaux-Arts.

== Gallery ==
Works by Luigi Loir

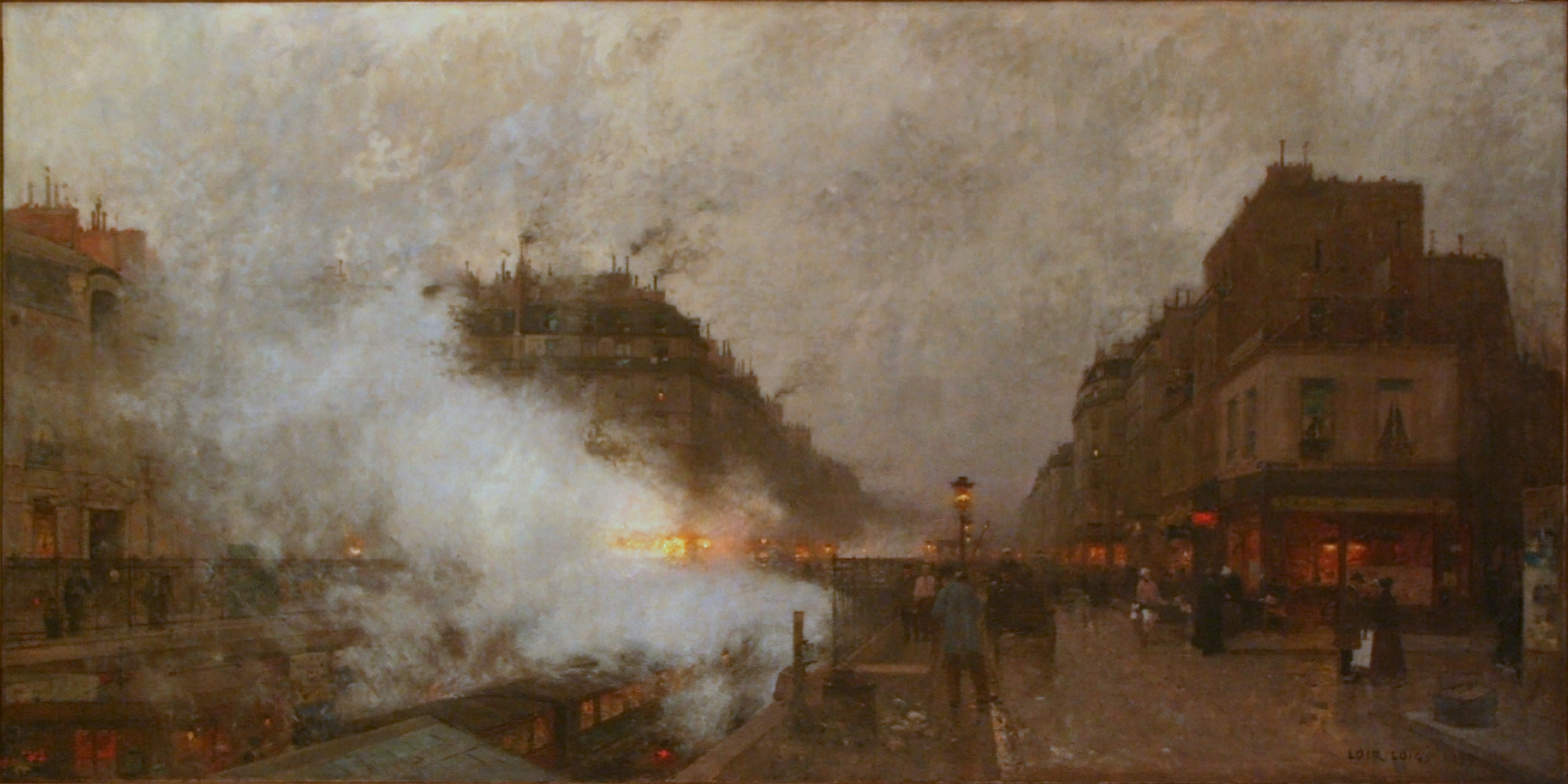
Le Métropolitain (1899), National Gallery in Prague

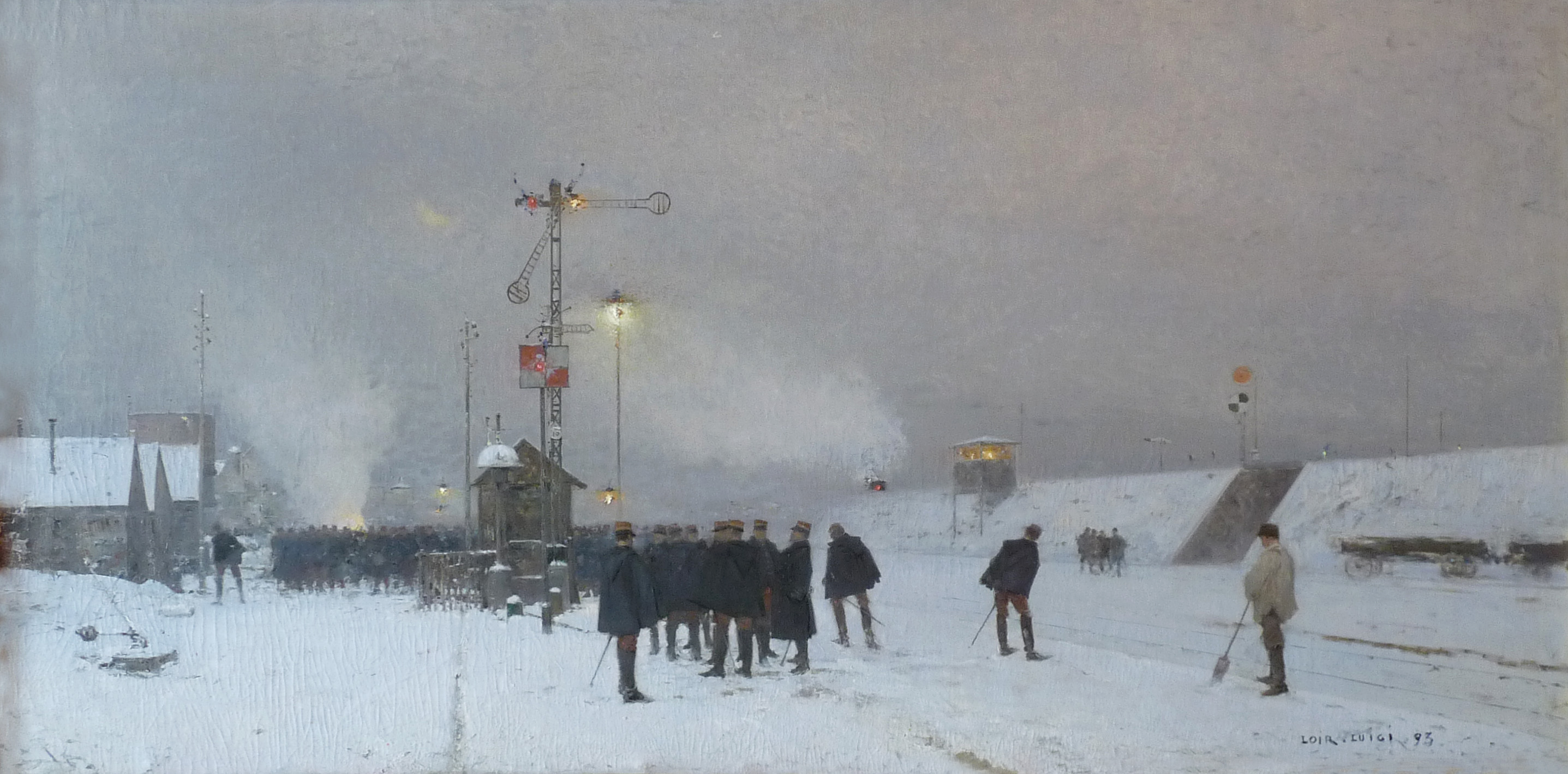
Avant l'embarquement, effet crépusculaire (1893), Bar-le-Duc, Musée Barrois

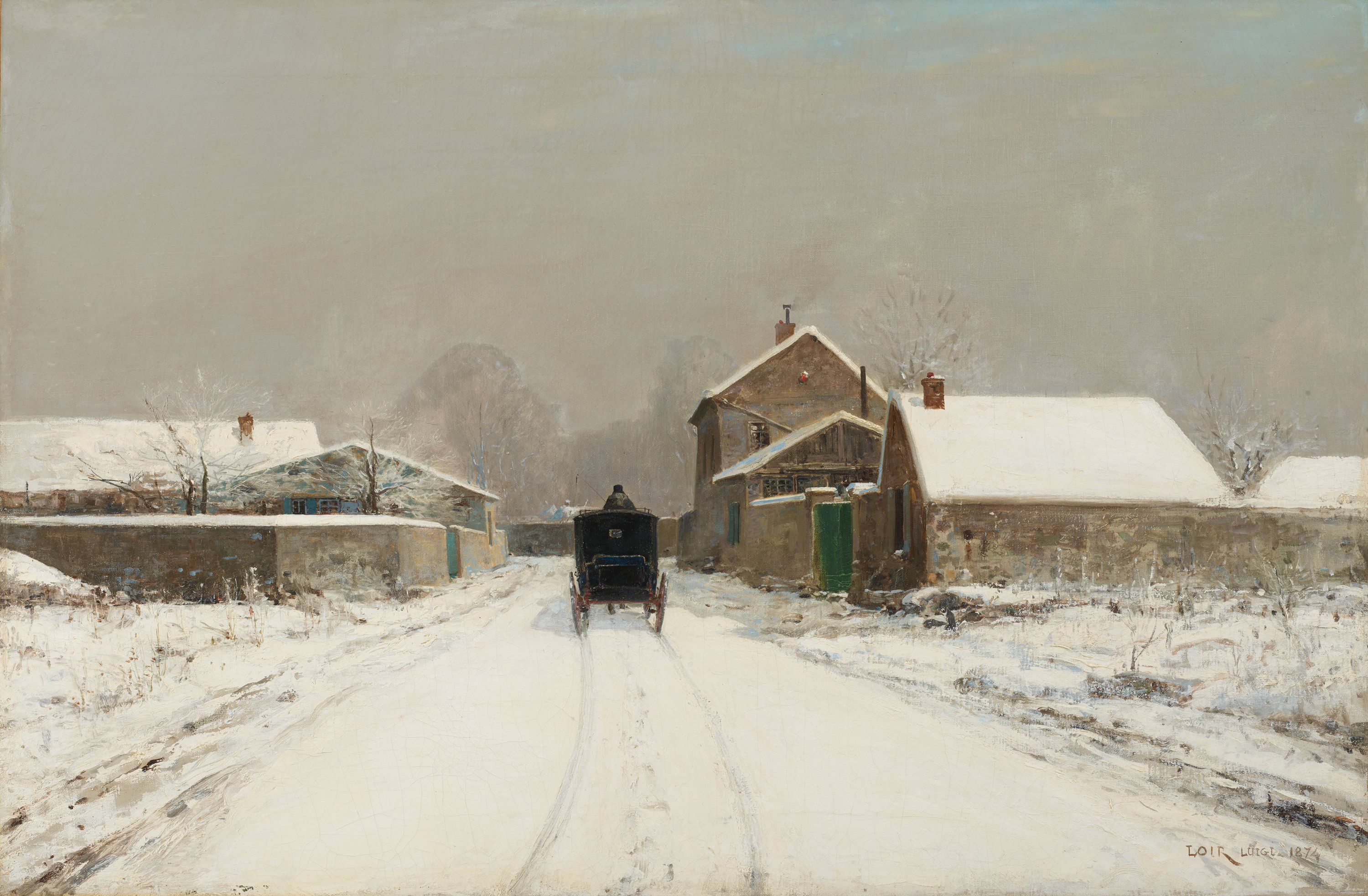
L'Avenue de Neuilly on a Winter Day (1874), Minneapolis Institute of Art

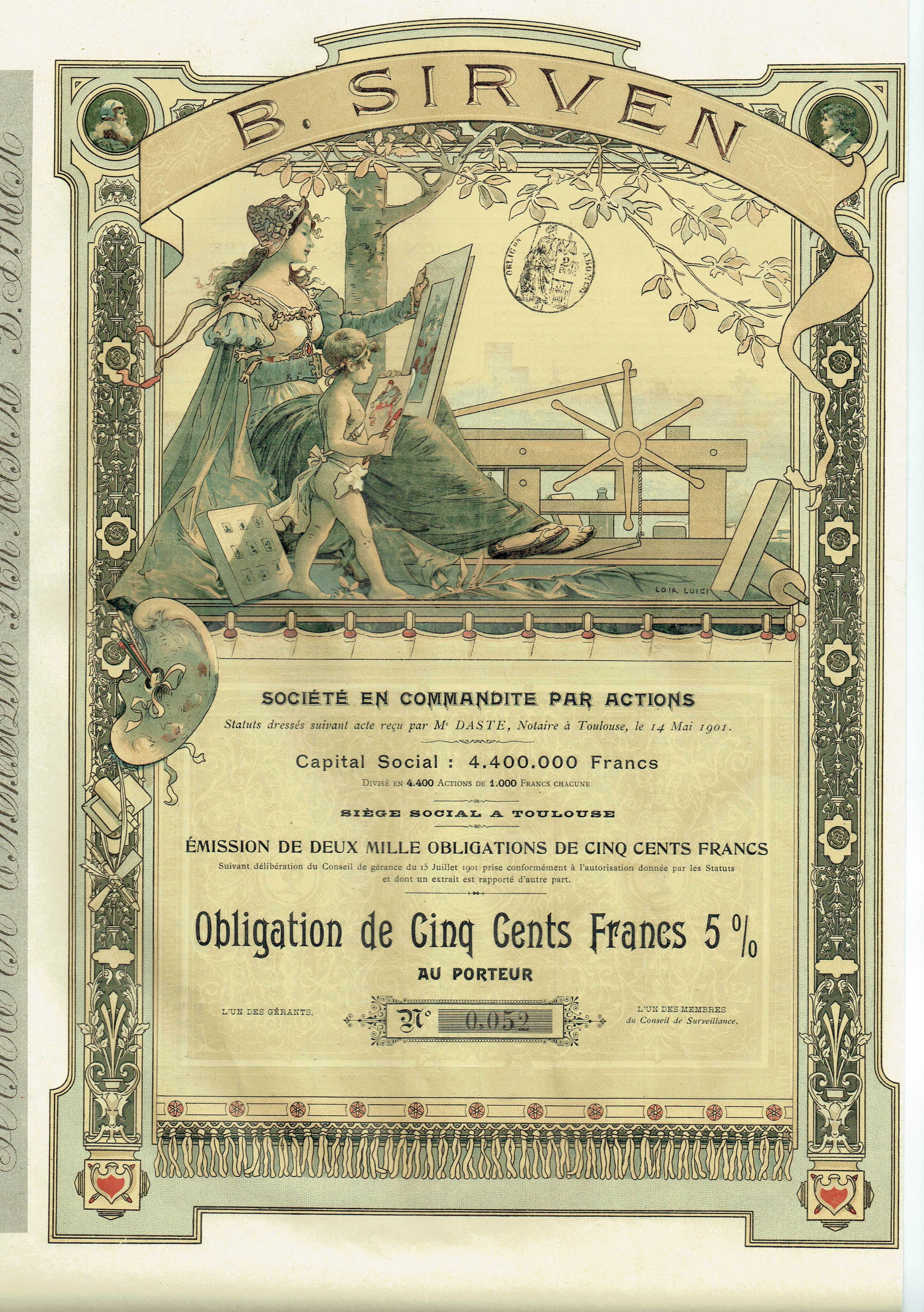
Bond of the company B. Sirven, issued 14. May 1901; illustrated by Luigi Loir

The Construction of the Metropolitan Railway (1900), André-Diligent Museum of Art and Industry, Roubaix.

== Bibliographie ==
- Noë Willer, Luigi Loir, 1845-1916: peintre de la Belle Époque à la publicité: catalogue raisonné, vol. I, édition Noë Willer, 2004, 221 p. ISBN 2-9514056-1-8
