= Jean-Bruno Gassies =

French painter

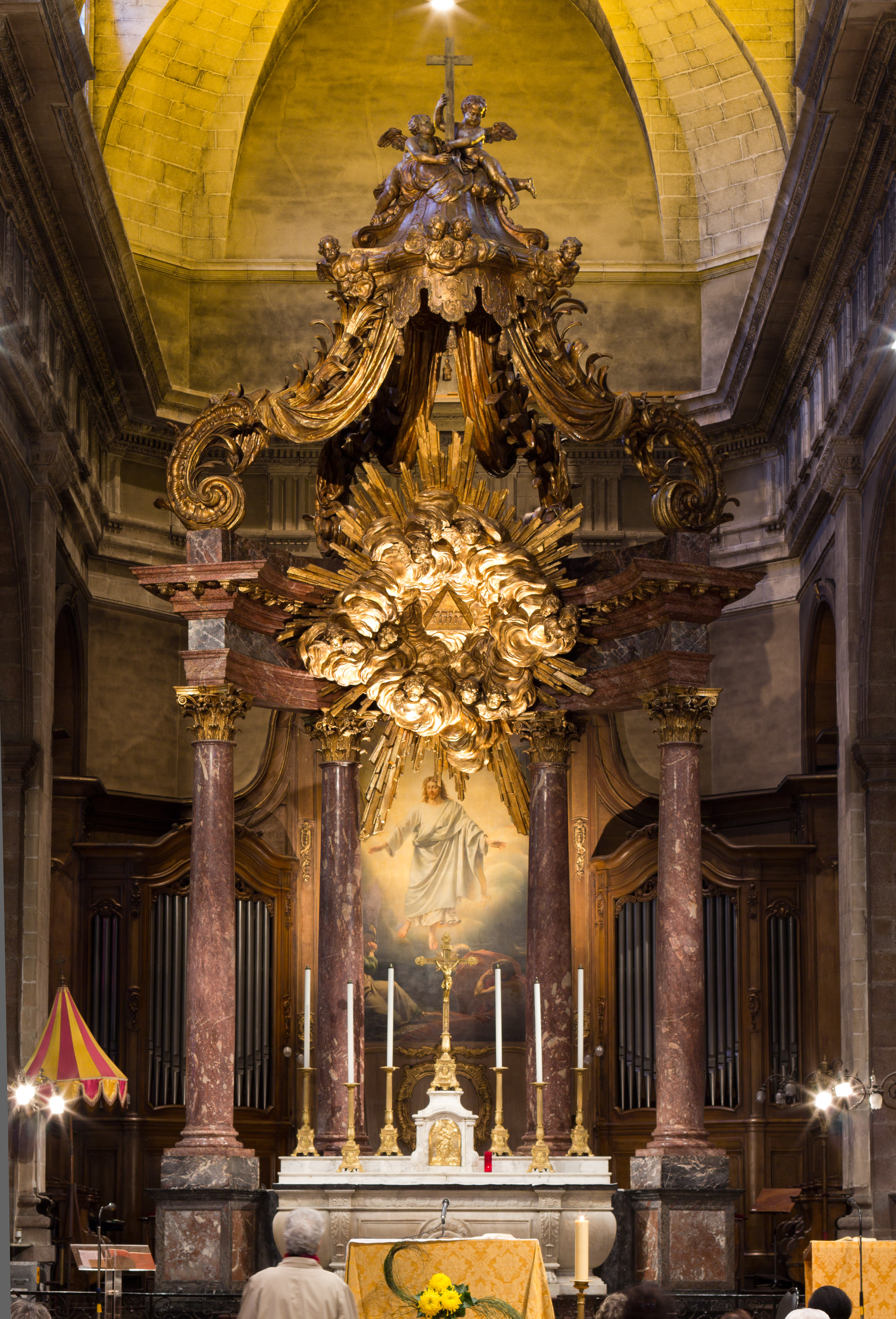
Transfiguration by Gassies, 1824 painting in the centre of the altar of the Basilica of the Saint Sauveur et Notre-Dame des Miracles et des Vertus in Rennes

Jean-Bruno Gassies (1786–1832), a French historical and genre painter, was born at Bordeaux.

He studied under Vincent and Pierre Lacour, and died in Paris in 1832. He chiefly executed historical subjects from the Old and New Testaments, or from French history; but the pictures exhibited by him embrace a great variety of subjects — historical, poetical, and allegorical — landscapes, marine views, interiors of churches, and striking scenes on the coasts of England and France.

Among his works are:

- Hagar and Ishmael. 1811. (Brussels Gallery)
- Virgil reading his Aeneid to Augustus. 1814.
- Horace at the Tomb of Virgil. 1817.
- Portrait of Louis XVIII. 1819. (Bordeaux Museum)
- The Communion of St. Louis. 1819.
- The Clemency of Louis XII. 1824. (Versailles Gallery)
- View of the Church of Boulogne. 1826.
- A Bivouac of the National Guard. 1831.
