= Pierre Lacour (the younger) =

French painter (1778–1859)

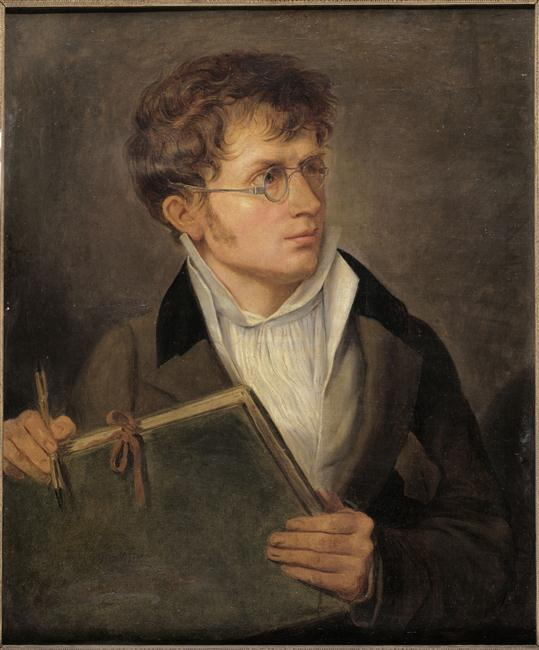
Pierre Lacour, the younger; portrait by his father Pierre Lacour

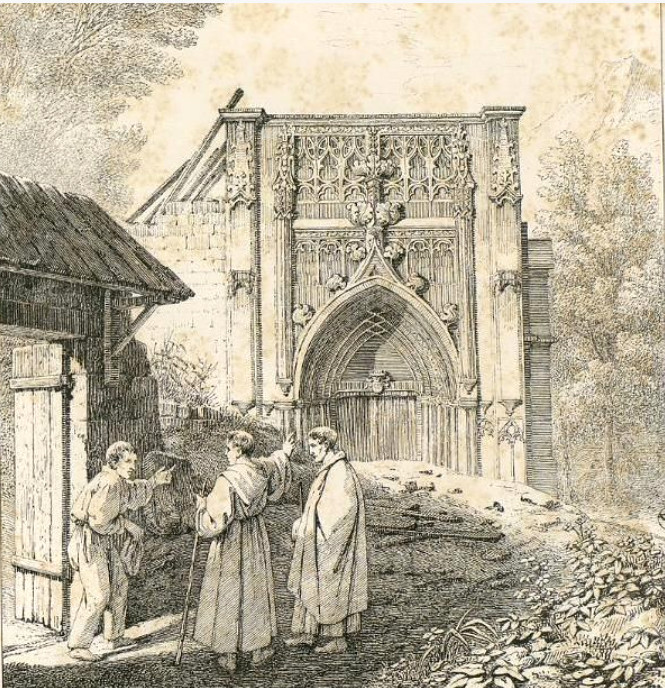
The Ruins of Hautecombe Abbey

Pierre Lacour, sometimes referred to as "The Younger" (16 March 1778 – 17 April 1859) was a French painter and engraver.

== Biography ==
He was born in Bordeaux. His father was the painter Pierre Lacour, sometimes referred to as "The Elder". In 1797, after a private school education, he went to Paris, where he studied with the miniaturist, François-André Vincent. Two years later he returned to Bordeaux and, from 1802 to 1822, created illustrations for the publications of the Société des amis du musée des beaux-arts de Bordeaux. In 1814, upon his father's death, he took over as Curator of the Musée des Beaux-Arts de Bordeaux and Professor at the local drawing school. One of his students was Rosario Weiss Zorrilla; the goddaughter (or as some believe, daughter) of Francisco Goya.

He and Jean-Baptiste Légé (1779–1846) opened a lithography studio in 1821 and, in 1823, he decided to give up painting in favor of engraving. From 1823 to 1825, he worked for the Musée d'Aquitaine. For two years, he had a workshop devoted to the creation of carpets and tapestries.

In 1813, he married Lisidice Combes (1794–1829); daughter of the architect Louis Combes. Politically, his convictions were Royalist, he was an adherent of Saint-Simonianism, and a defender of Neoclassicism. He was especially interested in Medieval architecture and believed that all art has a social function.

In 1824, he went on an extended pilgrimage to Rome. During the trip, he composed six travel diaries which have been digitalized by the Bordeaux municipal library. Thirty years later, during his retirement, he wrote a cultural study of Italy; complete with sketches he made during the trip.

In 1838, he resigned his official positions to open a private workshop, but continued to teach drawing at a small school in Bazas. Before his death, he composed a memoir, Notes et souvenirs d'un octogénaire, with reflections on the life of his father and well-known contemporary artists. He died in 1859 in Bordeaux.
