= The Milkmaid of Bordeaux =

Painting by Francisco de Goya

- Spanish: La lechera de Burdeos
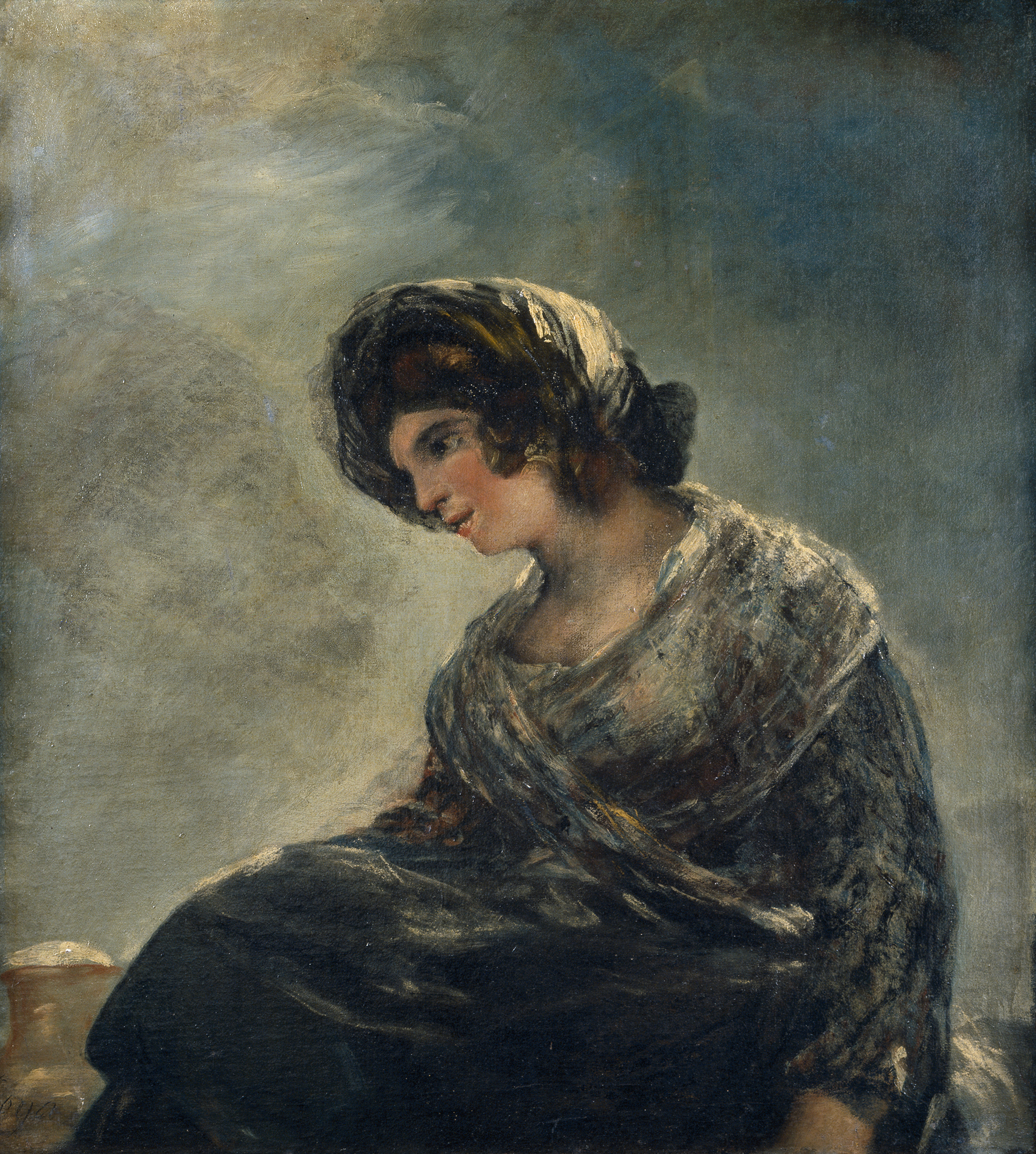
- Artist: Francisco Goya
- Year: 1825–1827
- Medium: oil on canvas
- Dimensions: 74 cm × 68 cm (29 in × 27 in)
- Location: Museo del Prado, Madrid

The Milkmaid of Bordeaux (Spanish: La lechera de Burdeos) is an oil-on-canvas painting completed between 1825 and 1827, generally attributed to the Spanish artist Francisco Goya (1746–1828). This painting is believed to be one of Goya's last works, completed the year before his death, and considered one of Goya's masterpieces.

== Controversy ==
Although the picture is held in great esteem and widely admired by critics and the public, doubt has been cast by art historians as to whether it is an actual Goya. If authentic, it is likely a portrait of either Rosario Weiss or, more likely, her mother Leocadia Weiss—the artist's nurse during the last years of his life. Leocadia cared for Goya in exile in Bordeaux, where he settled to live among politically liberal friends. The true nature of the relationship between Goya and Leocadia is unknown due to a lack of documentation, and while many sources refer to Leocadia as a nurse or housekeeper, others believe her to be Goya's mistress.

Following his death, the painting was willed to his last child, Javier (b. 1784). Financial difficulties a year later forced him to sell it to Juan Bautista de Muguiro, a distant relative. Muguiro's descendants donated the work to the Museo del Prado in 1946, where it remains a popular exhibit at the gallery, despite doubts as to its origin. While being widely admired by art historians and the public alike, The Milkmaid of Bordeaux remains one of Goya's works that is infrequently discussed, perhaps because it is considered not as ambitious as his other works.

Rosario was later a painter, and it is sometimes claimed that she may have been the creator of this work. However, when compared to her relatively amateur works in the Academia de San Fernando, it is generally considered highly unlikely. It has also been argued that Rosario was Goya's illegitimate daughter, but those claims are unsubstantiated, and it is highly unlikely, given that Leocadia was living with her husband at the time.

== Analysis ==
While not his most famous painting, The Milkmaid of Bordeaux is considered a technical masterpiece and among his best work. This portrait features a young woman wrapped in a shawl that Goya had likely bought himself, as mentioned in a letter from Leandro Fernandez de Moratin to Juan Antonio Melón. The work is his last portrait of a woman before his death.

The Milkmaid of Bordeaux has been interpreted as an ode to youth by an old man in failing health. Its brightness is such a departure in tone from his famous black paintings that it has been argued that Goya is not the artist of the painting, though this claim has little support. The brushstrokes and colouring of the painting speak to Goya's mastery of technique.

While in Bordeaux during the last years of his life, Goya made several drawings and paintings showing the daily life of ordinary people, some of which have been interpreted as a reflection of his faith in humanity, this work included. The portrait itself is of a young woman, presumably a milkmaid or peasant, appearing to sit in contemplation with her head lowered. Her hair is partially covered in a scarf, a shawl wraps around her shoulders, and an apron sits on her lap. Beside the woman, on the bottom left of the painting, sits what appears to be a milk jug or container of some kind. The sky in the background is just a blur of colours, and the position of the woman has been interpreted as implying that she is actually riding on a mule, though it, as well as her hands, are not visible in the painting.

== See also ==
- La Leocadia

== Bibliography ==
- Connell, Evan S. Francisco Goya: A Life. New York: Counterpoint, 2004. ISBN 1-58243-307-0
- Hagen, Rose-Marie & Hagen, Rainer. Francisco Goya, 1746-1828. Taschen, 2003. ISBN 3-8228-1823-2
- Hughes, Robert. Goya. New York: Alfred A. Knopf, 2004. ISBN 0-394-58028-1
- Junquera, Juan José. The Black Paintings of Goya. London: Scala Publishers, 2008. ISBN 1-85759-273-5
