= Jean Pastelot =

French painter

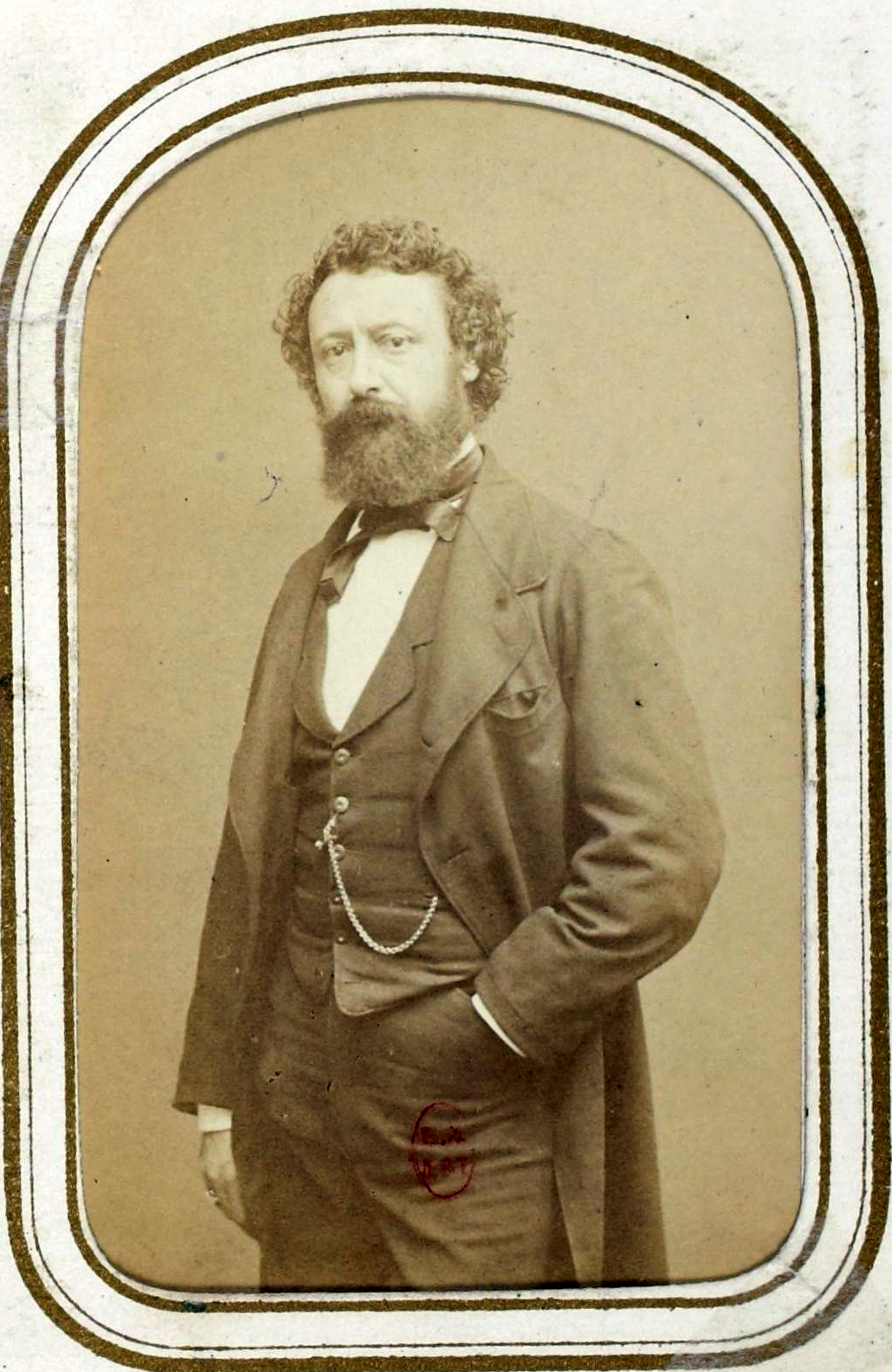
Jean Pastelot c. 1865

Jean Amable Amédée Pastelot (1820, Moulins – 1870, Paris) was a 19th-century French painter and caricaturist.

Jean Pastelot was the son of the dramatic artist, Denis Pastelot.

Luigi Loir (1845–1916) worked for him from 1863.
