= Rosario Weiss Zorrilla =

Spanish artist (1814–1843)

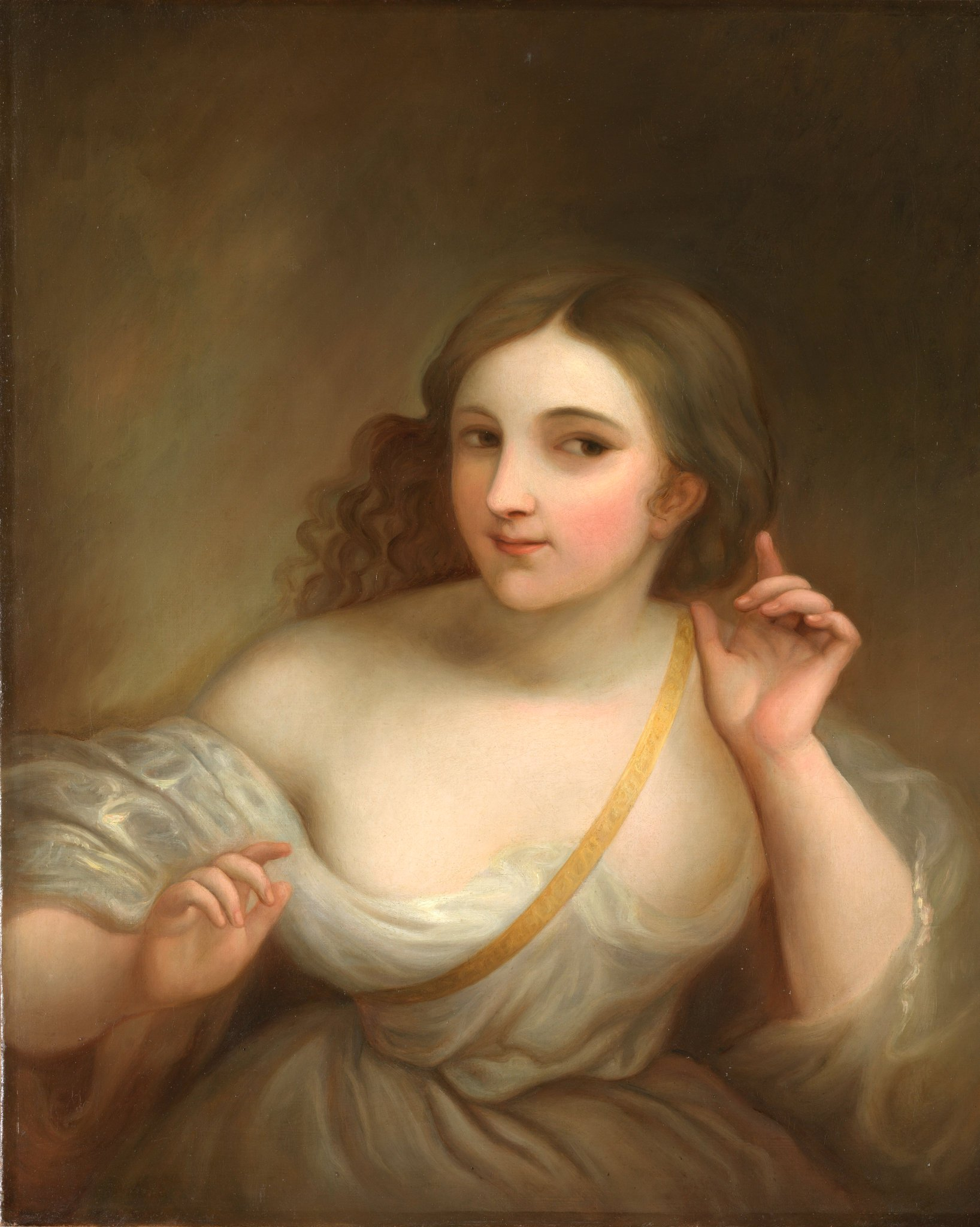
- Self-portrait, Prado Museum
- Born: October 2, 1814; Madrid, Spain
- Died: July 31, 1843 (aged 28); Madrid, Spain
- Awards: Silver medal from Sociedad Filomática de Burdeos

Maria del Rosario Weiss Zorrilla (2 October 1814 – 31 July 1843) was a Spanish painter and engraver best known for portraits. She was the goddaughter of Francisco de Goya and lived with him during his final years when her mother was his maid. Over seventy of her drawings, preserved at the Hispanic Society of America, were once attributed to Goya but, in 1956, the art historian José López-Rey demonstrated conclusively that they were hers.

== Biography ==
She was born in Madrid, the daughter of Leocadia Zorrilla and, according to baptismal documents, her husband of seven years, Isidore Weiss, a German-Jewish jeweler whose family lived in Madrid. However, in 1811, Weiss had sworn out a legal complaint accusing Leocadia of "illicit conduct". This, together with the fact that she went to live with Goya in 1817 (as his housekeeper, officially) fueled speculation that Rosario was Goya's child; or certainly not Weiss' in any event.

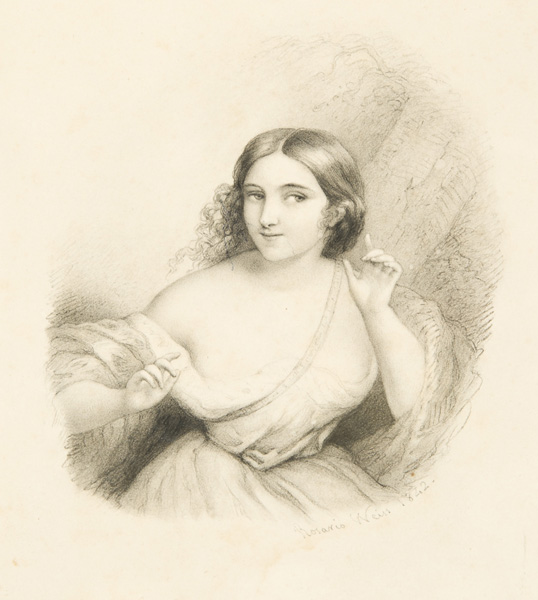
An Allegory of Attention

Goya began giving her drawing lessons, together with her first writing lessons, when she was only seven. She studied with him until age fifteen and then with architect Tiburcio Pérez from 1823 to 1824. Later, when he was living in self-exile in Bordeaux, she was the student of a local wallpaper designer. At one point, he proposed sending her to Paris. This did not work out, so, in 1827, she was placed under the tutelage of Pierre Lacour; son of the better-known Pierre Lacour.

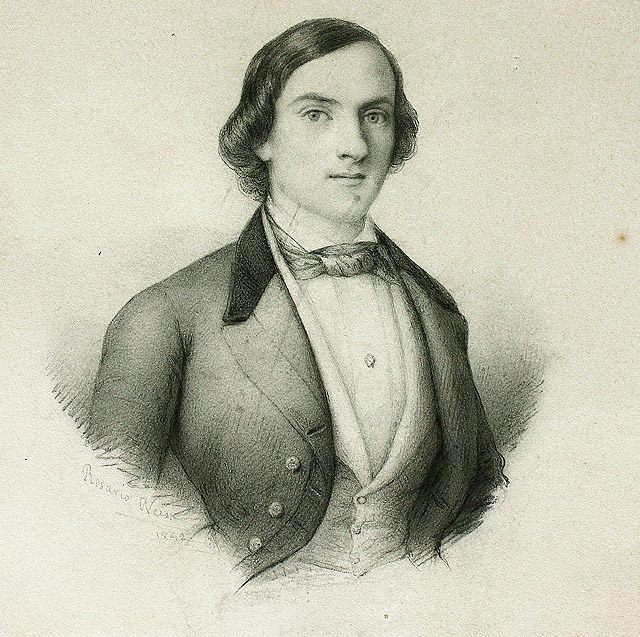
Portrait of her brother, Guillermo

After Goya's death in 1828, Leocadia's relationship with his family became strained (she had been left out of Goya's will and felt that Javier had treated her poorly) so, as soon as possible, she and Rosario returned to Spain. That was in 1833, following an amnesty for those who had opposed King Ferdinand VII. Once there, Rosario helped support her family by making copies of the Old Masters at the Museo del Prado. She continued her work as a copyist at the Real Academia de Bellas Artes de San Fernando and in various private collections. She also participated in exhibitions there and at the Liceo Artístico y Literario. In 1840, the Academia named her an "Academician of Merit".

That same year, she obtained an appointment as drawing tutor to Princesses Isabel and Luisa Fernanda, receiving a salary of 8,000 reales. This position was apparently obtained by liberal friends of her brother, Guillermo, who knew Agustín Argüelles, Isabel's legal guardian.

Zorilla also did work as an illustrator. She illustrated Isla de Cuba pintoresca by Manuela de Andueza.

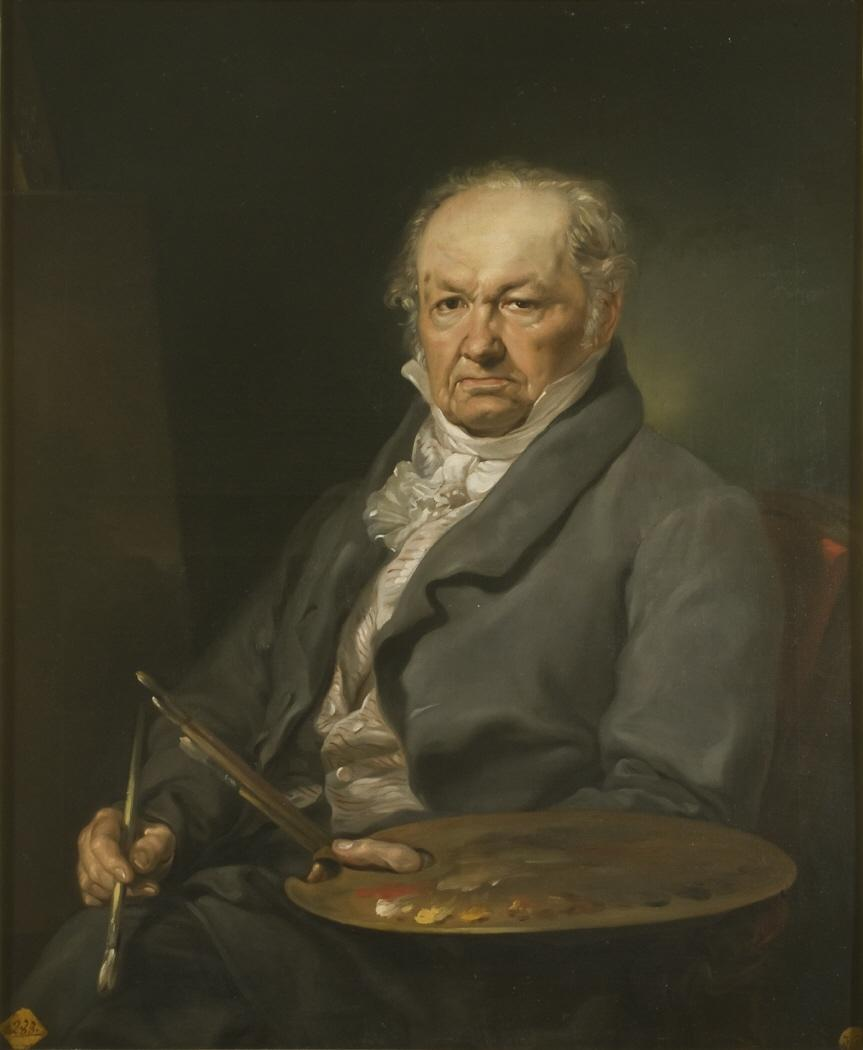
Rosario Weiss Zorilla, copy of portrait of Goya by Vicente Lopez

According to a report by the royal doctor, her sudden death at the age of twenty-eight seems to have been precipitated by a severe emotional shock she suffered upon encountering a violent demonstration while leaving the Royal Palace, the day after the fall of the Espartero régime; what might now be called an acute stress reaction. However, an obituary in the Gaceta de Madrid from later that year, written by a friend of her brother, indicates that she died from an intestinal infection (probably cholera).

== Works in collections ==
Various institutions in Madrid hold works by Rosario Weiss Zorrilla in their collections. Paintings, drawings and lithographs are preserved in the National Library of Spain, the library of the Royal Spanish Academy, the Lázaro Galdiano Museum, the Royal Academy of San Fernando, the Museum of Romanticism. In 2014, the Prado Museum acquired one of her drawings and her copy of a larger original painting by Rafael Tegeo Díaz of the Duke and Duchess of San Fernando de Quiroga.
