= Pierre Lacour =

French painter and printmaker (1745–1814)

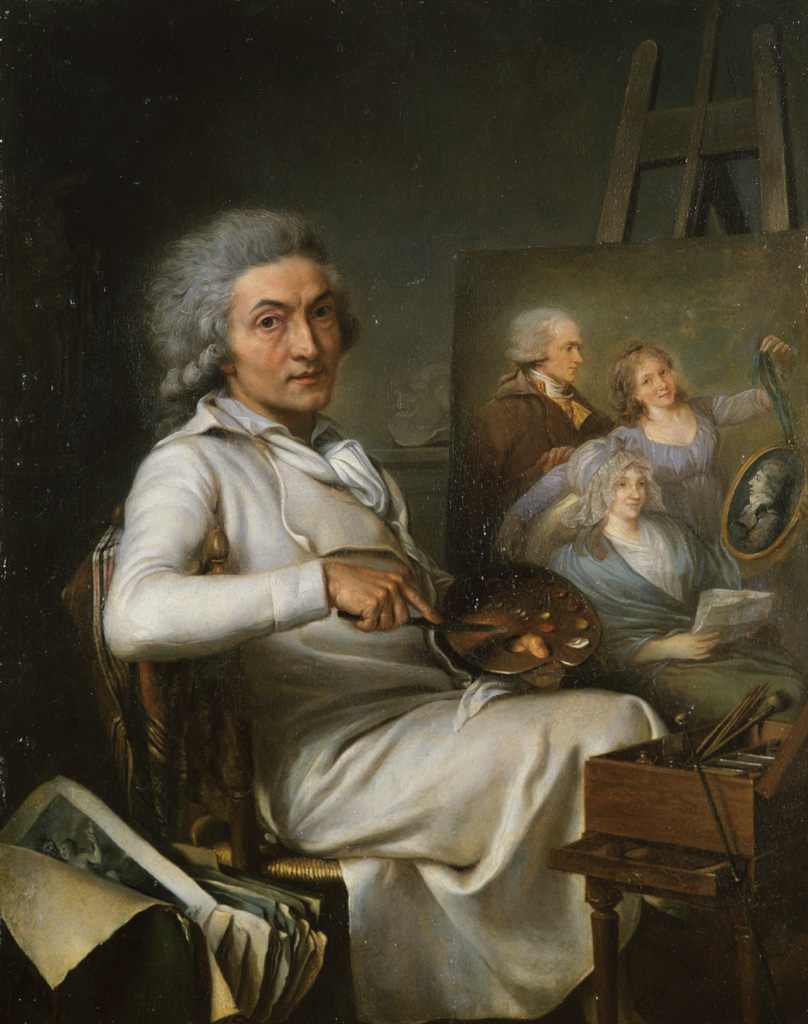
- Self-portrait, with his family (1798)
- Born: 15 April 1745; Bordeaux, Kingdom of France
- Died: 28 January 1814 (aged 68); Bordeaux
- Spouse: Catherine Chauvet
- Children: Pierre Lacour

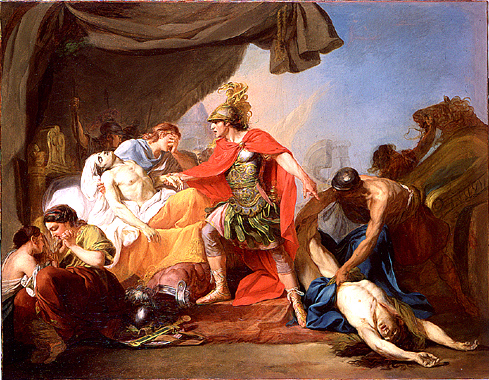
Achilles Deposits Hector's Corpse at the Feet of Patroclus (Prix de Rome)

Pierre Lacour, originally Delacour (15 April 1745 – 28 January 1814) was a French painter.

== Biography ==
His first artistic studies were in the workshop of the engraver, André Lavau (1722-1808). In 1764, he went to Paris to continue his studies with the painter, Joseph-Marie Vien. He was awarded second place in the Prix de Rome of 1769. He spent some time in Rome sometime around 1771 and became an Agrégé at the Académie nationale des sciences, belles-lettres et arts de Bordeaux in 1772. Two years later, he was named an Academician.

In 1778, he married Catherine Chauvet. Documents from that time give his occupation as "history painter". During the Revolution, he was a drawing teacher at the École centrale and maintained the old municipal drawing school at his personal expense.

His first exhibit at the Salon came in 1796; the same year he was named a corresponding member of the Académie des beaux-arts. Three years later, he was elected to the Academy of Sciences.. In 1801, he founded the Musée des beaux-arts de Bordeaux and became its first Curator. In 1803, he became a Professor and, from 1804 until his death, served as the Director of the School of Painting and Design.

In addition, he was placed in charge of restoring the Palais Rohan. His many students included Pierre-Nolasque Bergeret, Jean Alaux and Jean-Bruno Gassies. Upon his death, his son, also named Pierre Lacour, succeeded him as Curator of the museum.

== Works ==
- Achilles Deposits Hector's Corpse at the Feet of Patroclus (1769), École nationale supérieure des Beaux-Arts
- St. Roch displayed in 1776
- Arrivée du comtte d'Estaing à Brest (Arrival of Comté d'Estaing in Brest), displayed at the Salon in 1782
- Reunited Portrait of Judges and Consuls of Bordeaux in 1786 (Portraits réunis des juges et consuls de la Bourse de Bordeaux), displayed in 1787
- Ambassador Sully in London (Ambassade de Sully à Londres), displayed in 1787
- Étienne de Baecque
- Portrait of Mme. Pierre Guibert
- Works in the Musée des beaux-arts de Bordeaux:
  - L’Artiste peignant un portrait de famille
  - Vue d'une partie du port et des quais de Bordeaux : dit Les Chartrons et Bacalan (View of the Some Ports and Quays in Bordeaux: Les Chartrans and Bacalan)
  - Portrait de Pierre Lacour fils (Portrait of Pierre Lacour, Junior) (1778-1859)
  - Cléopâtre se désolant dans le tombeau de Marc-Antoine (1781)
- Château de Versailles and Trianon: René-Augustin de Maupeou (1714-1792), chancellor of France

== Sources ==
- Robert Mesuret, Pierre Lacour, 1745-1814, published by Delmas (Bordeaux) 1937
- Pierre Lacour, notes and memories of an octogenarian artist, 1778-1798, edition prepared by Philippe Le Leyzour and Dominque Cant, Museum of Fine Arts in Bordeaux and William Blake publishers, Périgueux, Fanlac 1989, ISBN 2-902067-13-5
