= Musée des Beaux-Arts de Bordeaux =

Museum of fine arts in Bordeaux, France

Coordinates: 44.8374°N 0.5810°W

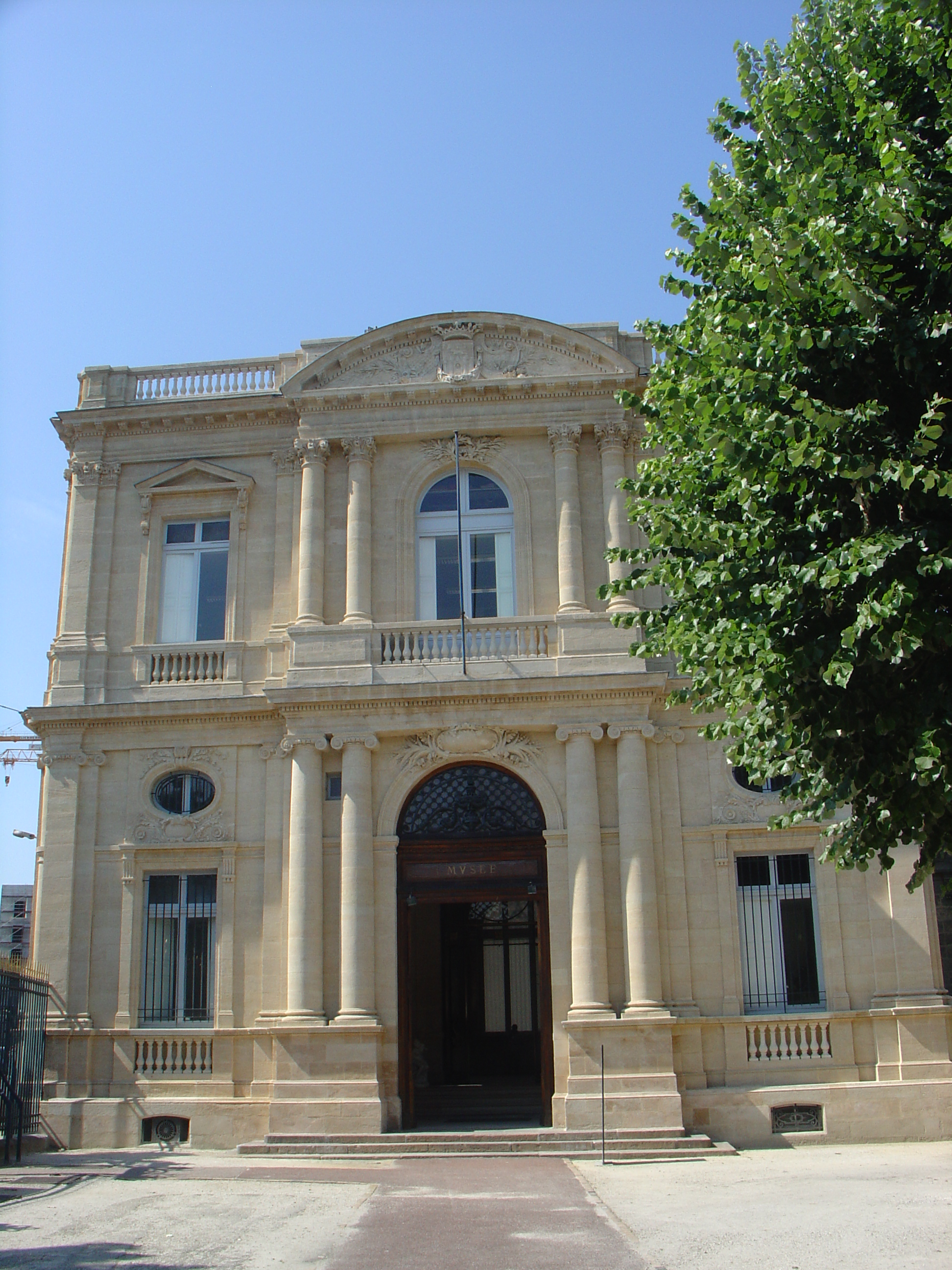
- Entrance facade of the north wing
- Established: 1801
- Location: 20, cours d'Albret 33000 Bordeaux
- Visitors: 117,492 (2014)
- Public transit access: Tramway, lines A and B, stop Hôtel de ville
- Website: www.musba-bordeaux.fr/en

The Musée des Beaux-Arts de Bordeaux is the fine-art museum of the city of Bordeaux, France. The museum is housed in a dependency of the Palais Rohan in central Bordeaux. Its collections include paintings, sculptures and drawings from the 15th century to the 20th century. The largest collection is composed of paintings, and its strong points are works by French, Flemish painters and Dutch painters.

In front of the building, there is the Galerie des Beaux-Arts, where temporary exhibitions are housed.

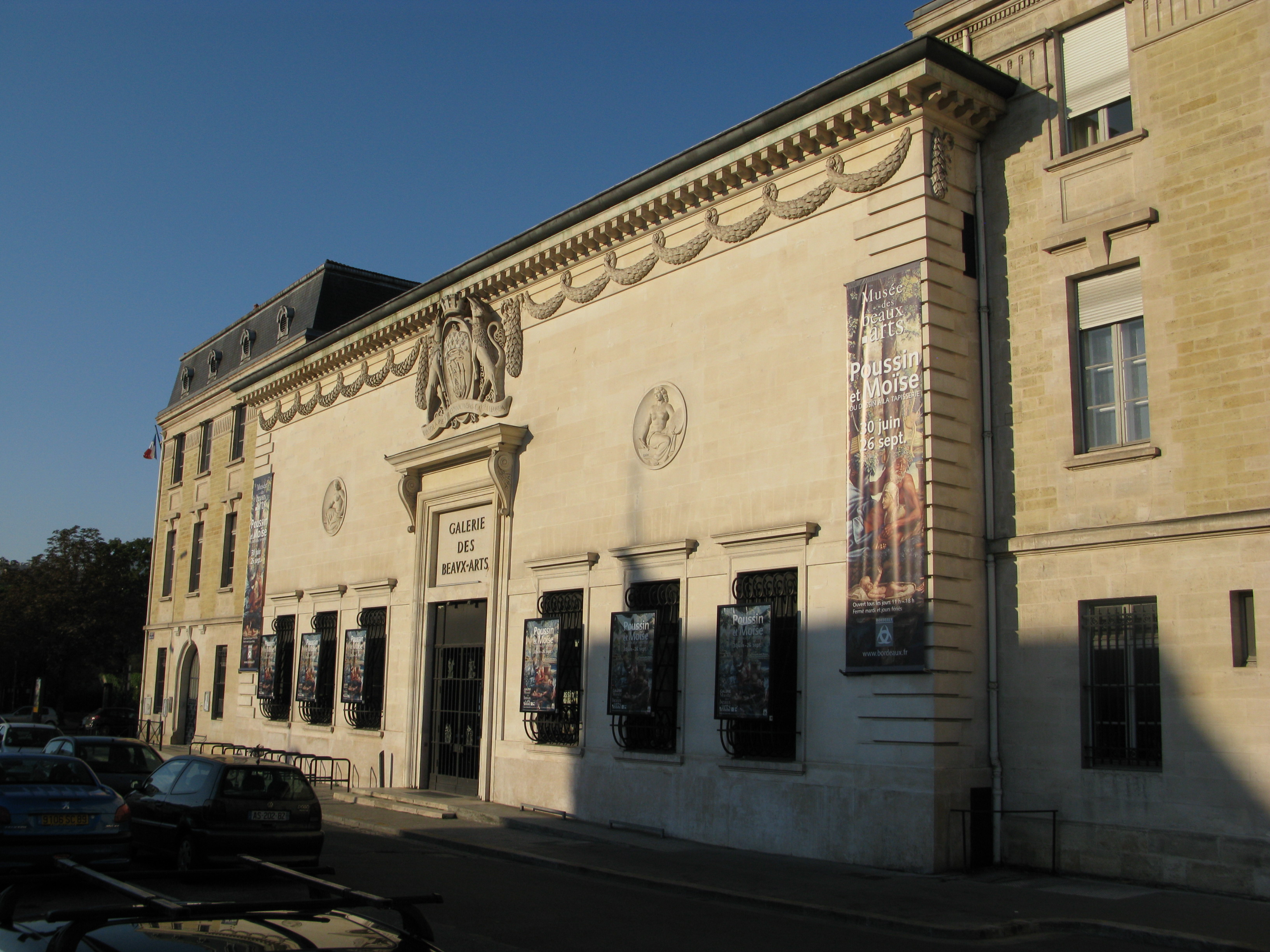
Façade of the Galerie des Beaux-Arts

== History ==
Established in 1801 by the painter Pierre Lacour, it is one of the largest art galleries in France outside Paris. The museum holds several paintings that were looted by the French during the French Revolution (the saisies révolutionnaires) such as the Martyrdom of Saint Georges by Peter Paul Rubens.

First hosted in a library and then in a room of the town hall, the collection was moved into the current building after its construction from 1875 to 1881. The Galerie des Beaux-Arts was built later, from 1936 to 1939.

== Painting collection ==
Here is a list of some of the painters represented in the museum collections:

- Abraham Govaerts
- Abraham Hondius
- Albert Marquet: Naples, the steamer
- Alessandro Magnasco
- Alfred Smith
- Allan Ramsay
- André Lhote
- Antoine-Jean Gros
- Antonio Bellucci
- Anthony van Dyck
- Artus Wolffort
- Auguste Renoir: Landscape of Cagnes
- Jean-Joseph Benjamin-Constant: Moroccan prisoners
- Benjamin West: Three paintings
- Camille Corot: Diana bathing
- Camille Roqueplan
- Carle Vernet
- Horace Vernet
- Carle Vernet
- Charles-François Daubigny: The banks of the Oise
- Chaïm Soutine: L'homme bleu sur la route (La montée de Cagnes)
- Domenico Pellegrini
- Édouard Joseph Dantan
- Eugène Boudin: Low Tide at Étaples
- Eugène Delacroix: Greece on the ruins of Missolonghi
- Eugène Isabey
- François-André Vincent
- Félix Ziem
- Giacomo Legi
- Giorgio Vasari
- Giambattista Pittoni
- Giovanni Boldini
- Giovanni Do
- Hendrick Ter Brugghen
- Henri Gervex
- Henri Martin
- Henri Matisse: Portrait of Bevilacqua
- Herman van Swanevelt
- Jacques Blanchard
- Jacques Raymond Brascassat
- Jan Davidsz de Heem
- Jan Brueghel the Younger
- Jan Porcellis
- Jan van Goyen
- Jean Restout
- Jean Siméon Chardin: Still life with meat
- Jean-Baptiste Perronneau
- Jean-Joseph Taillasson
- Jean-Léon Gérôme
- Jean-Marc Nattier
- Jean-Paul Laurens
- Jean-Pierre Alexandre Antigna
- Johann Friedrich August Tischbein
- Johan Joseph Zoffany: The Triumph of Venus
- John Lewis Brown
- Joos de Momper
- Joshua Reynolds
- Perugino
- Louis Valtat
- Luca Giordano
- Léon Cogniet
- Mary Cassatt
- Melchior d'Hondecoeter
- Narcisse Virgilio Díaz
- Nicolaes Maes
- Odilon Redon
- Oskar Kokoschka
- Pablo Picasso: Olga reading
- Paul Baudry
- Paolo Veronese
- Pierre Bonnard
- Pietro da Cortona
- Pierre-Narcisse Guérin
- Peter Paul Rubens
- Rigoberto Perez Soler:Idyll Ibiza
- Théodore Gudin
- Thomas Couture
- Thomas Lawrence
- Tiziano Vecellio known as Titian
- Trophime Bigot
- William-Adolphe Bouguereau

== Gallery ==
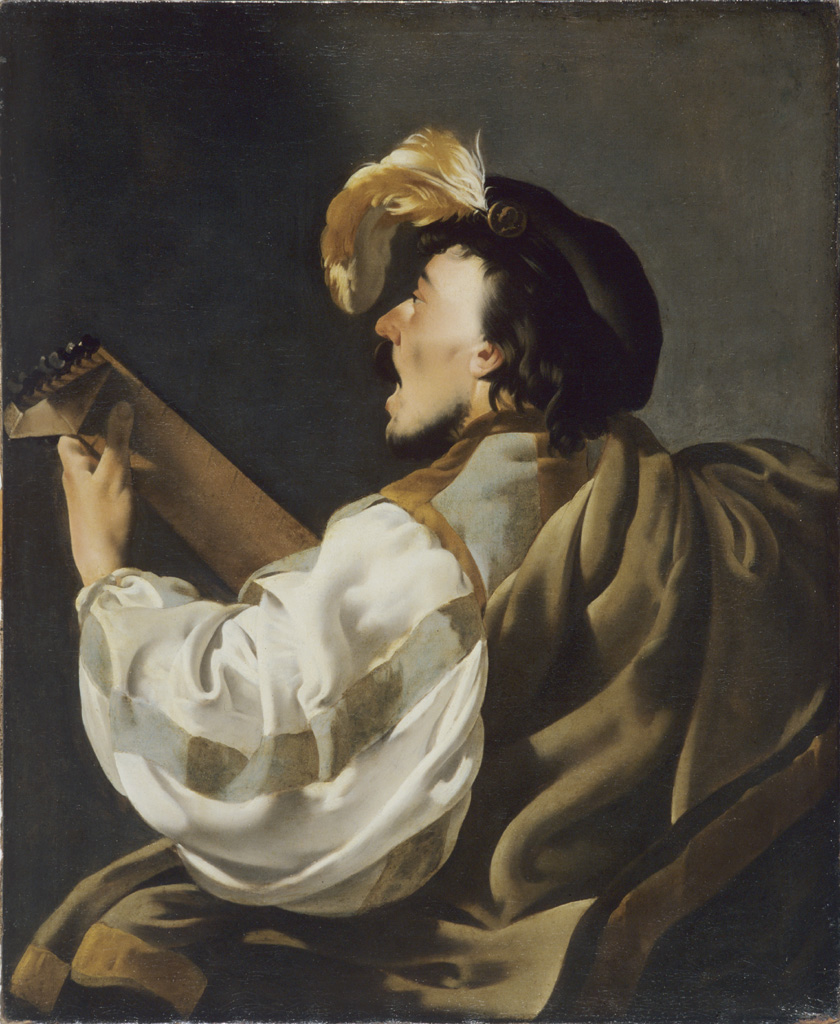
Hendrick Ter Brugghen, Un chanteur accompagnant au luth, before 1629.

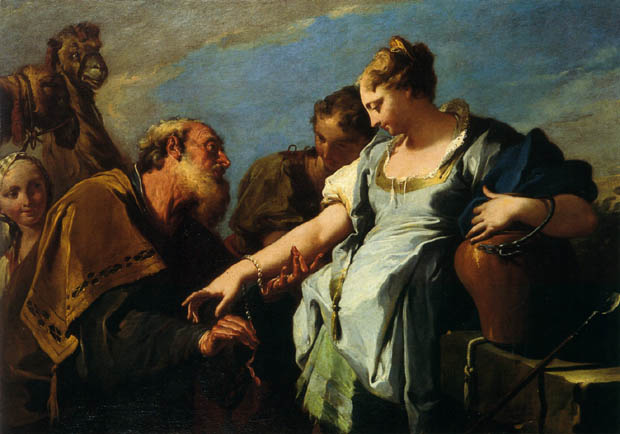
Giambattista Pittoni, Eliezer and Rebecca, before 1725.

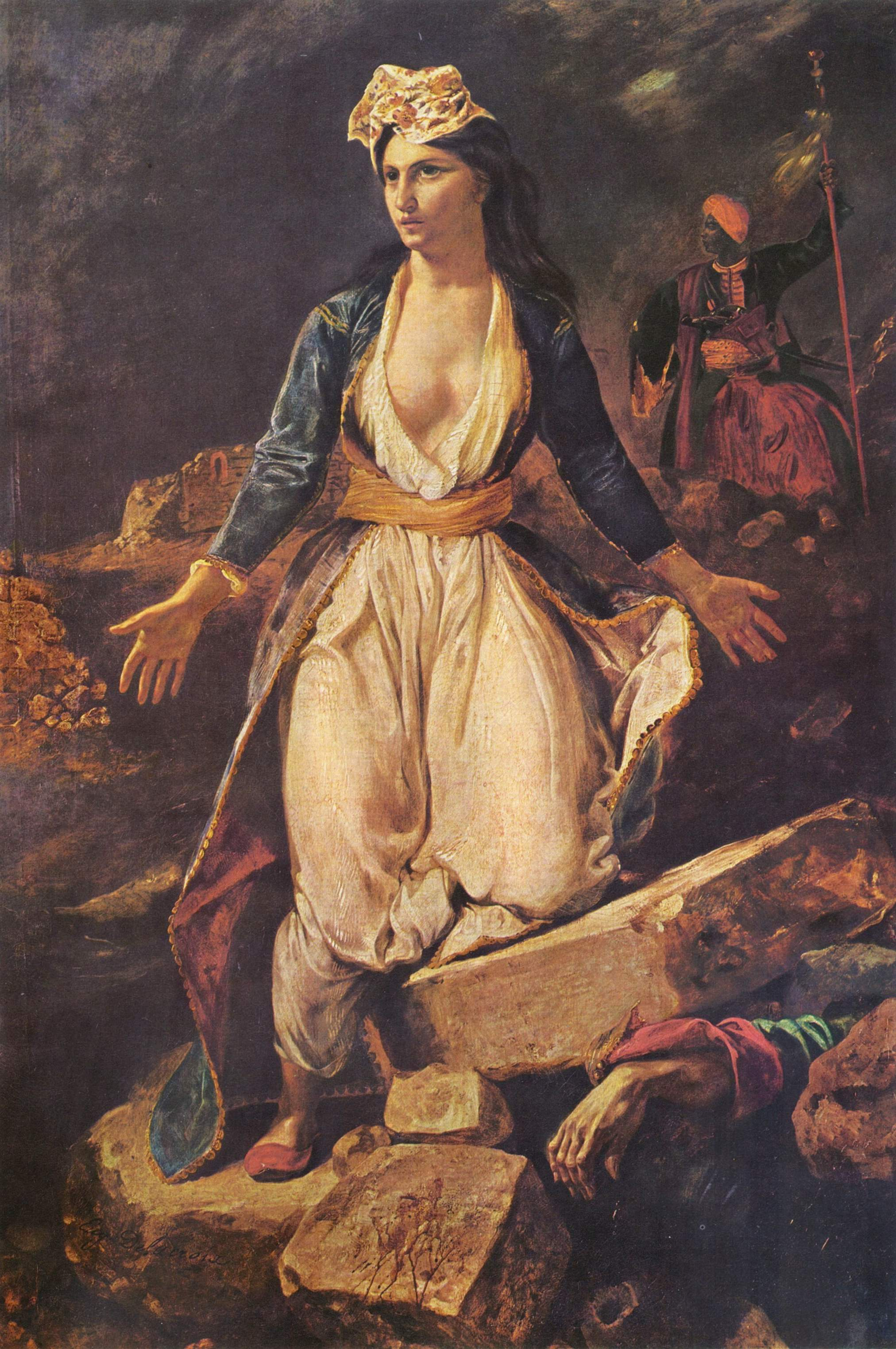
Delacroix, Greece on the ruins of Missolonghi.

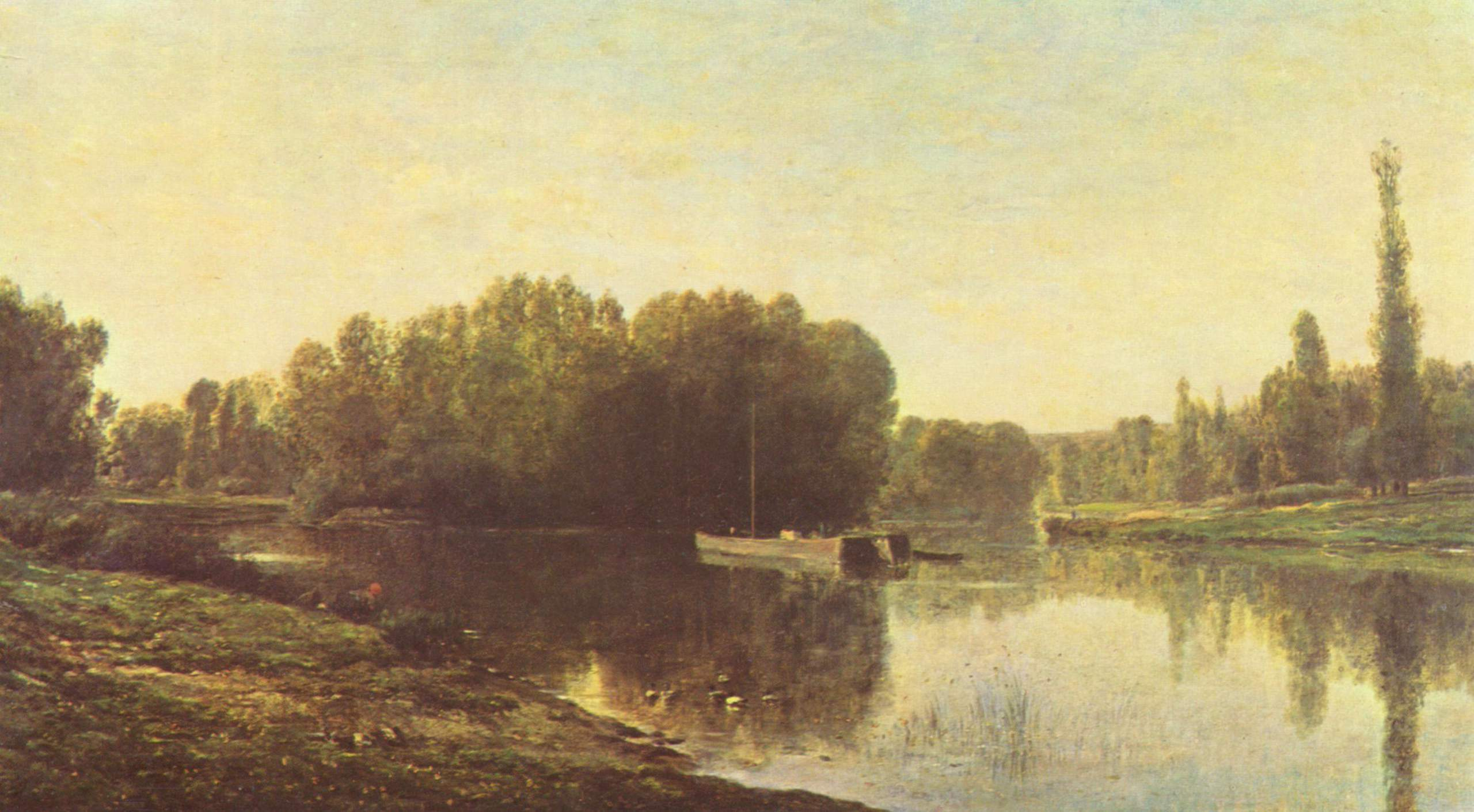
Daubigny, The banks of the Oise.

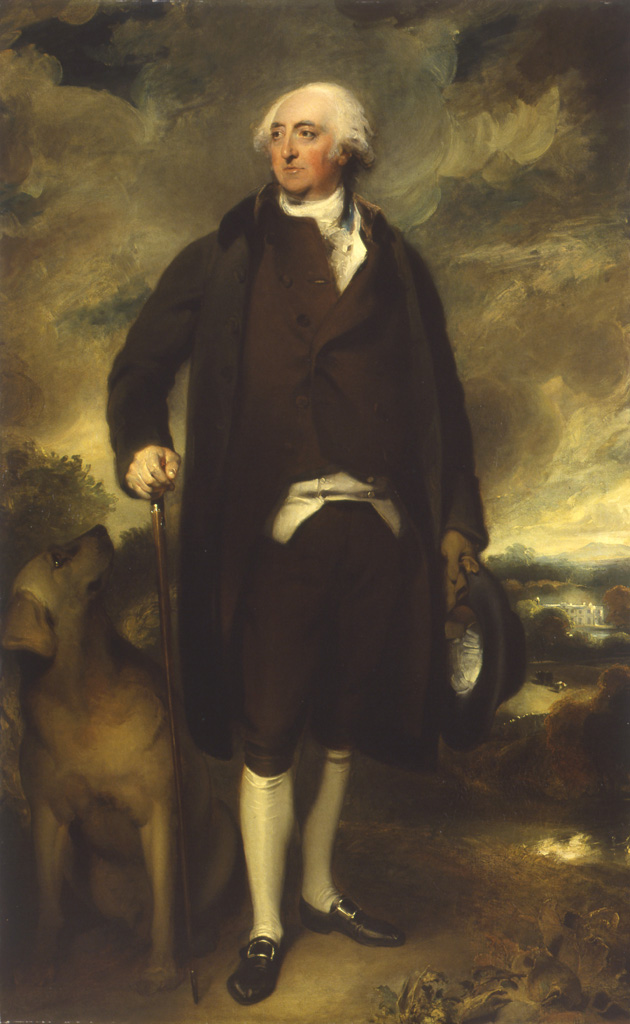
Portrait of John Hunter by Thomas Lawrence

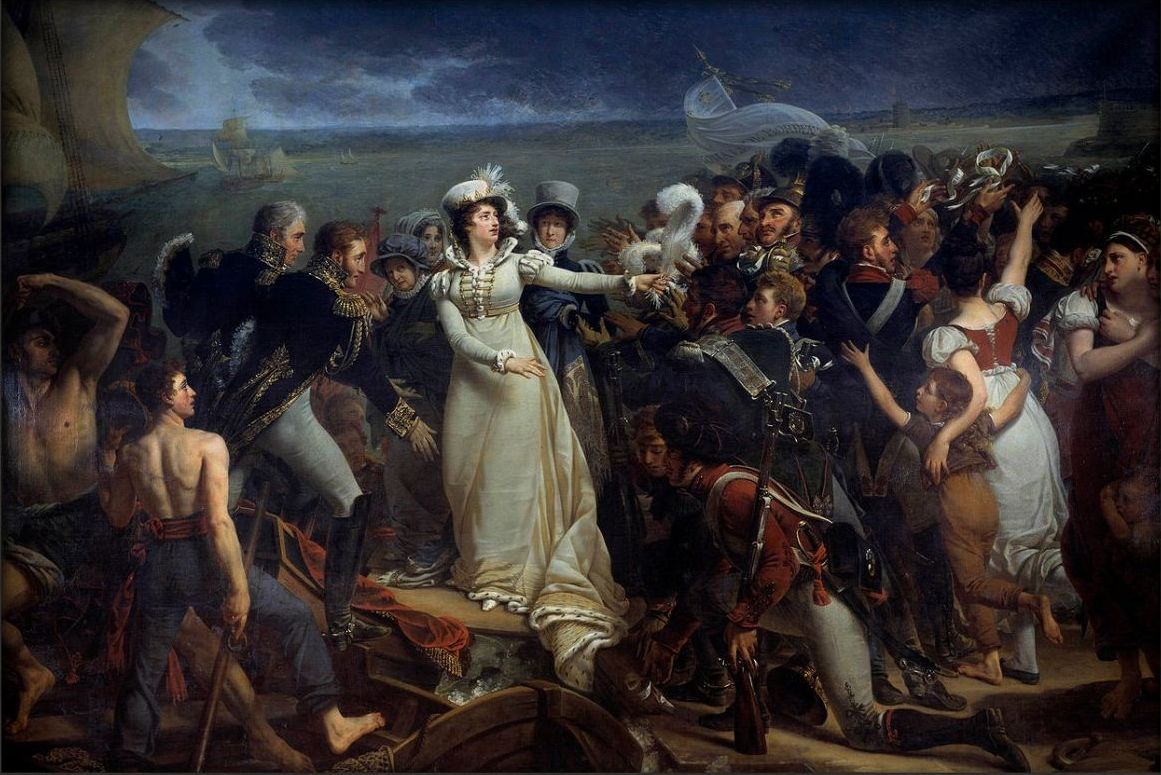
Antoine-Jean Gros, The Embarkation of the Duchess of Angoulême at Pauillac, 1818

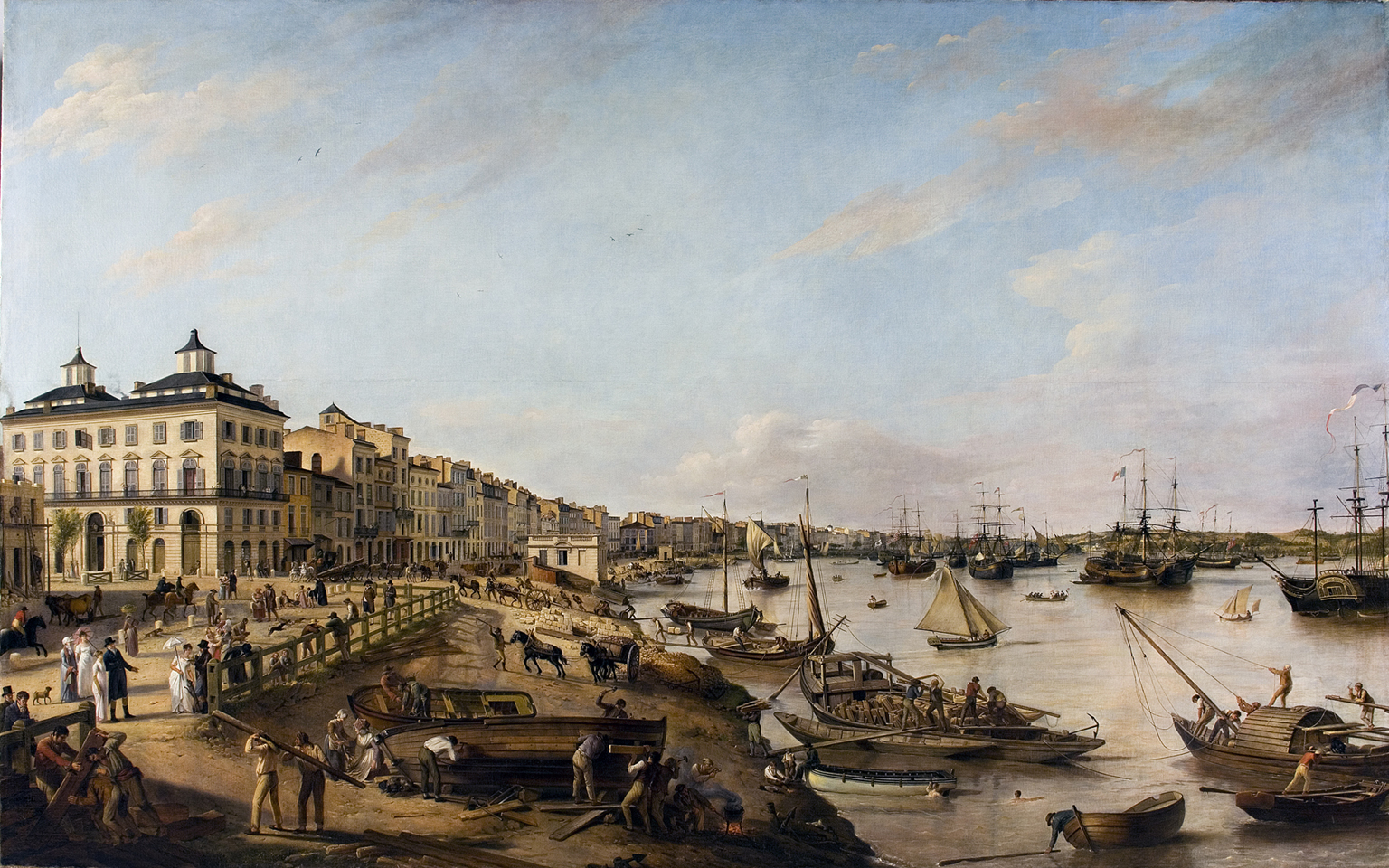
Pierre Lacour, Vue d’une partie du port et des quais de Bordeaux dits des Chartrons et de Bacalan, 1804.

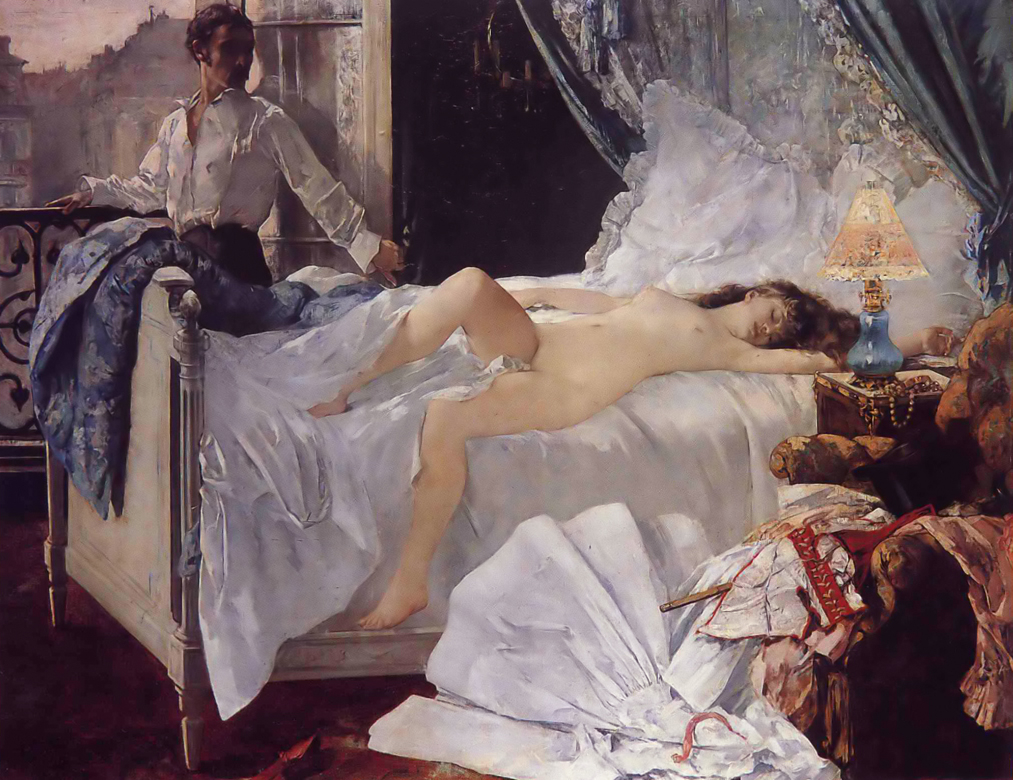
Henri Gervex, Rolla, 1878,.

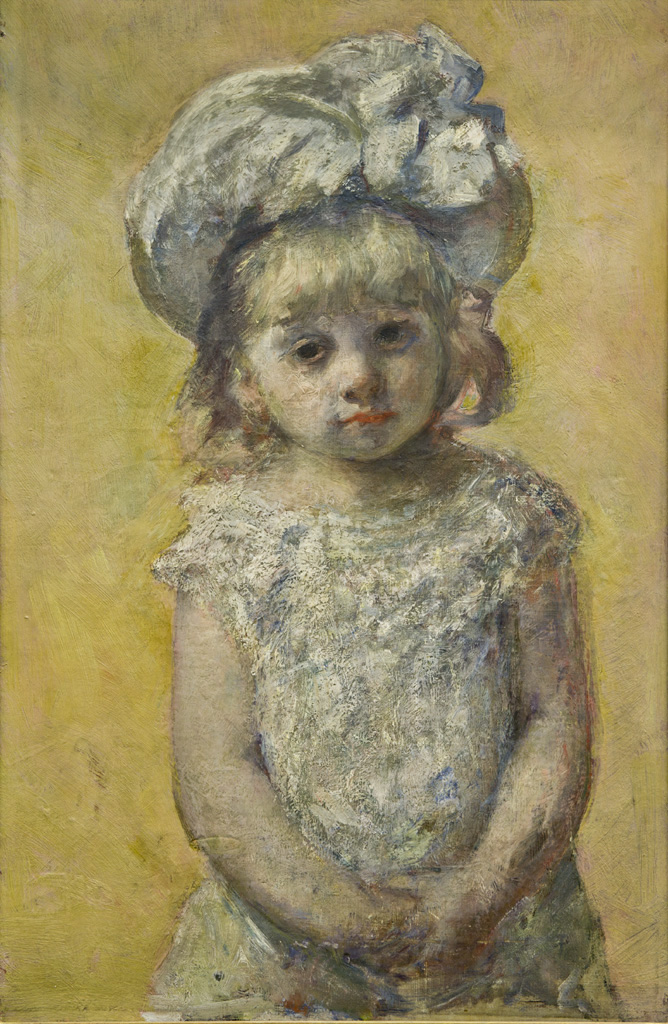
Mary Cassatt, Portrait de fillette, 1879.

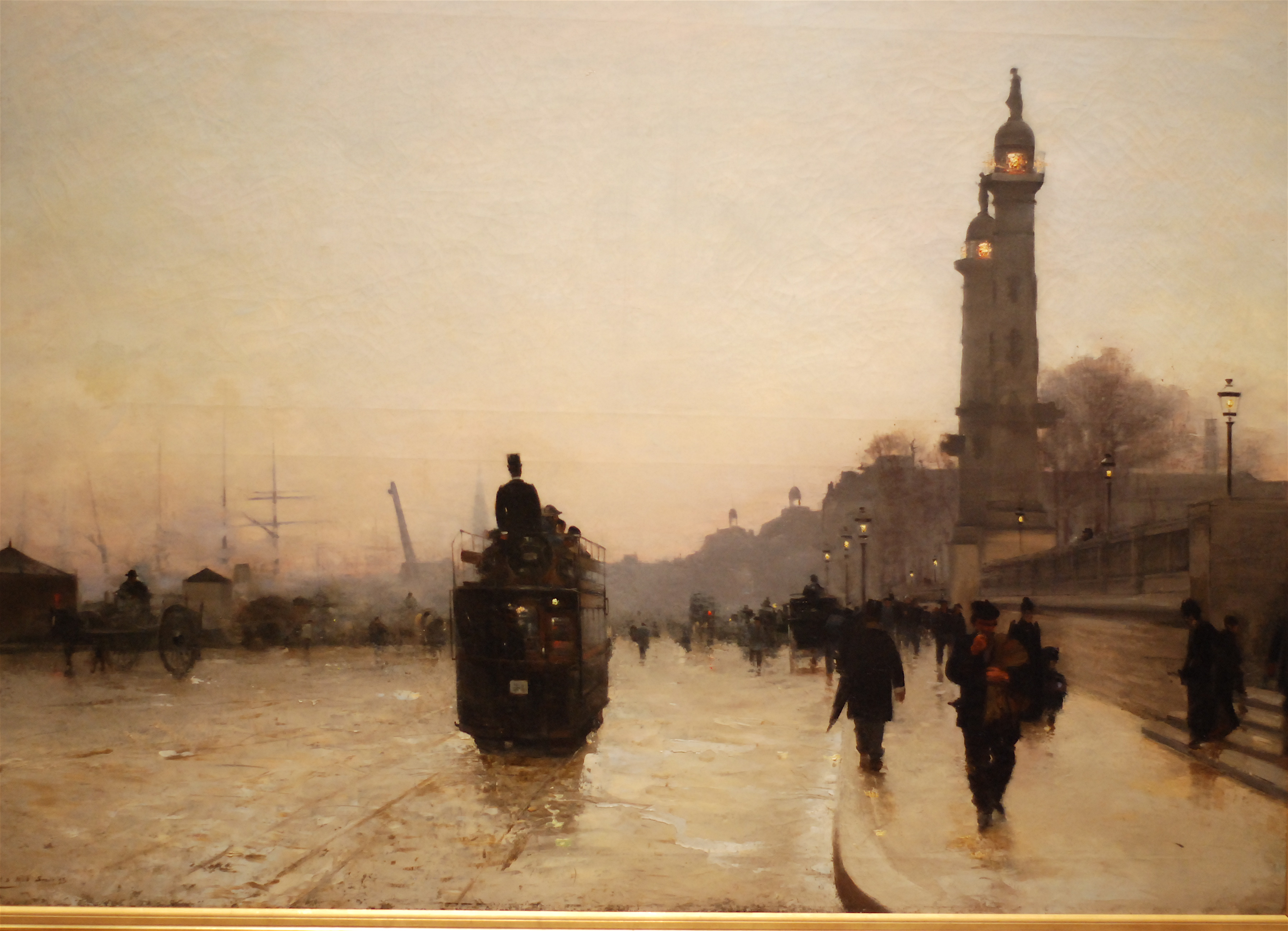
Alfred Smith, Le quai de Bacalan à Bordeaux le soir, 1883,.

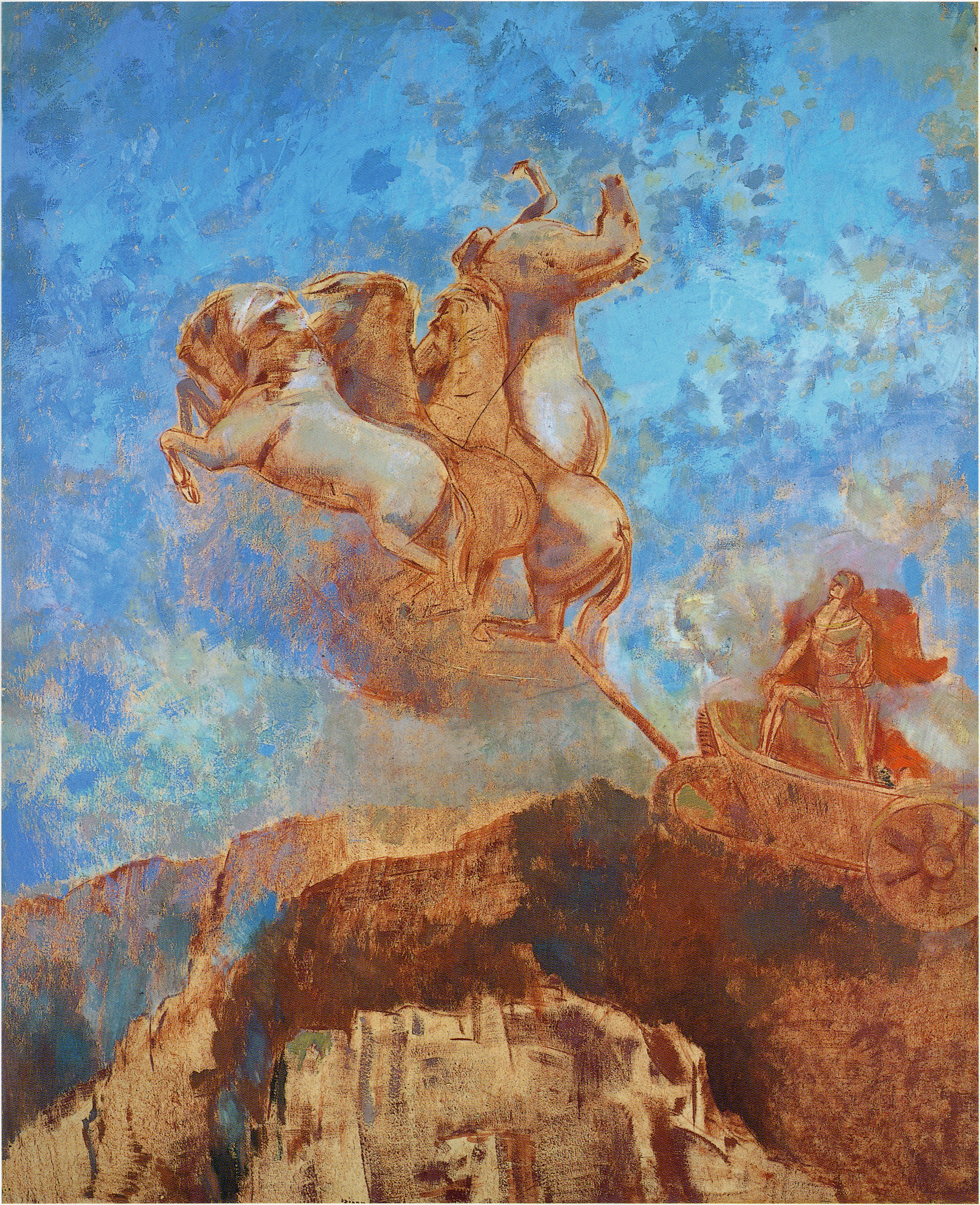
Odilon Redon, The Chariot of Apollo, 1909.

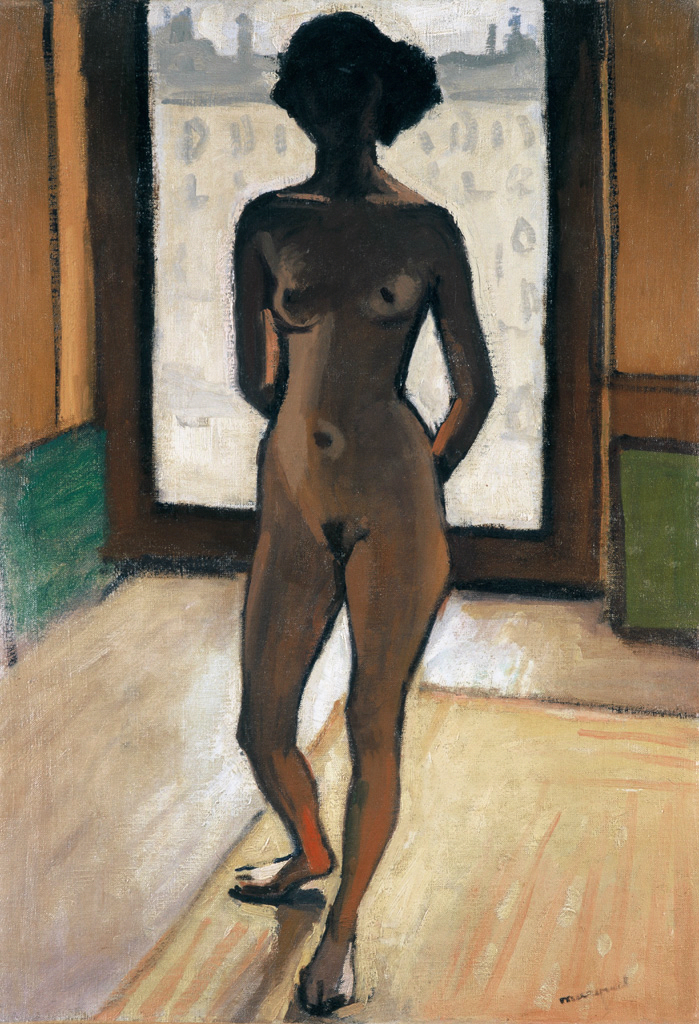
Albert Marquet, Nu en contre-jour, 1909.
