= François-André Isambert =

French lawyer, historian, and politician

M. Isambert
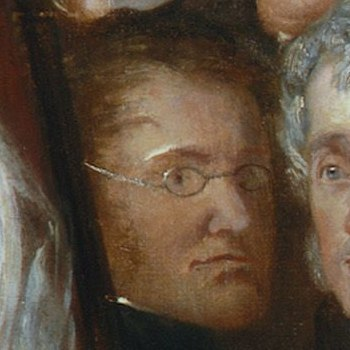
- in a crowd in the 1840 painting.
- Born: 1792; Aunay-sous-Auneau, Eure-et-Loir
- Died: 1857 (aged 64–65)
- Resting place: Montmartre Cemetery
- Occupations: Lawyer, politician

François-André Isambert (November 30, 1792 – April 13, 1857) was a French lawyer, historian, and politician. Isambert was founder and for an extended period contributor of the Gazette des Tribunaux and actively participated in Louis François Wolowski's Revue de législation et de jurisprudence.

== Under the Bourbons and the July Revolution ==
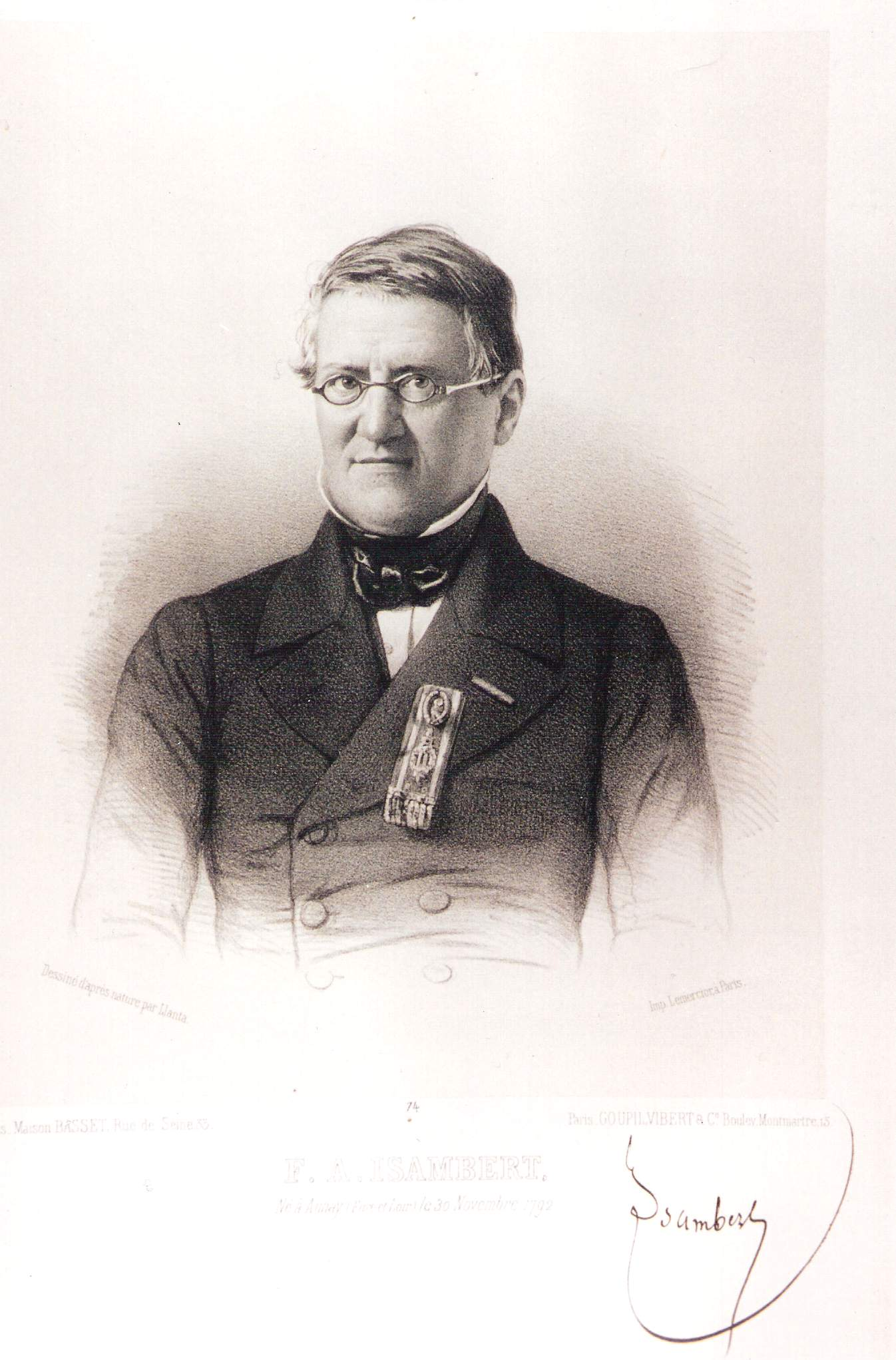
François-André Isambert, 1848.

Born in Aunay-sous-Auneau, Eure-et-Loir, Isambert studied law and, in 1818 (under the Second Restoration of the Bourbons), an attorney at the Cassation Court. As a member of the Chamber of Deputies, he worked for legislative and administrative reforms in the colonies, and was noted for his attacks on the Roman Catholic Church.

He protested against the Ordinances of the year 1830 in the name of the bar, and thus sided with the Revolution and the July Monarchy. He went among the first to the town hall, where he was named by the provisional government director of the Bulletin de Lois. Named counsel at the cassation court on August 27, he edited the Constitutional Charter, and joined the Chamber of Deputies in October of that year.

== Abolition of Slavery ==
In the painting of the 1840 Anti-Slavery convention there is a figure to the left described as "M.M.Isambert" and in the centre is John Scoble the secretary of the British Anti-Slavery group who organised the convention. Francois Isambert had been in correspondence with Scoble and he was an active figure in trying to free the French slaves.

== July Monarchy and 1848 ==
Isambert voted for the government of Jacques Laffitte, but joined the opposition under the minister Casimir Périer. In 1834, he founded the Société pour l'abolition de l'esclavage, a militant abolitionist organisation.

After the Revolution of 1848, he was elected to the French National Assembly for the Eure-et-Loir department, and joined the Right in the Constituent Assembly, but wasn't reelected to the legislative. 1854, he converted to Protestantism; he died in Paris.

== Works ==
- Recueil complet des lois et ordonnances à compter du 1er avril 1814 (Paris, 1820–30, 17 Vols.), with complete commentary
- Recueil général des anciennes lois francaises depuis l'an 1420 jusqu'à la révolution de 1789 (Paris, 1821–33, 29 Vols.), a collection he published together with Jourdan, Decrusy, Armet and Taillandier
- Annales politiques et diplomatiques (Paris, 1823, 5 Vols.; 2. Ed. 1826)
- Essai historique sur l'étude du droit naturel, du droit public et du droit des gens (Paris, 1826)
- Code électoral et municipal (2. Ed., Paris, 1831, 3 Vols.)
- État religieux de la France et de l'Europe (Paris, 1843–1844, 2 Parts)
- Histoire de Justinien (Paris, 1856, 2 Vols.)
- Anecdota (Paris, 1856), a translation of Procopius
- Pandectes françaises (Paris, 1834, 2 Vols.), a complete collection of French laws, decrees and records up to his time, written for practical use, have remained unfinished.
- Mémoire pour S. Ex. Le président de la République d'Haïti, contre M. Blanchet, avocat, sur la question morale de ce procès (Paris, 1827), Imprimerie de E. Duverger, Manioc
