= Marie Yvonne Laur =

French artist

- Born: 22 July 1879; Paris
- Died: 11 November 1944 (aged 65); Ravensbrück
- Known for: Painting

Marie Yvonne Laur, also known as Yo Laur and born as Laure Alice Yvonne Brunel, (Paris, 22 July 1879 - Ravensbrück, 11 November 1944) was a French painter and member of the Freemasonry movement.

== Biography ==
Laure Alice Yvonne Brunel was the daughter, granddaughter and niece of a painter. Her father was Alfred Arthur Brunel de Neuville (1852–1941), a famous French genre painter who painted still lifes and animals (especially cats), and Louise Félicité Neuville (1858–1903), She had three sisters, but was the only one in the family to take up her father's torch as a painter.[1] Her grandfather was the painter Léon Brunel (1816–1896).

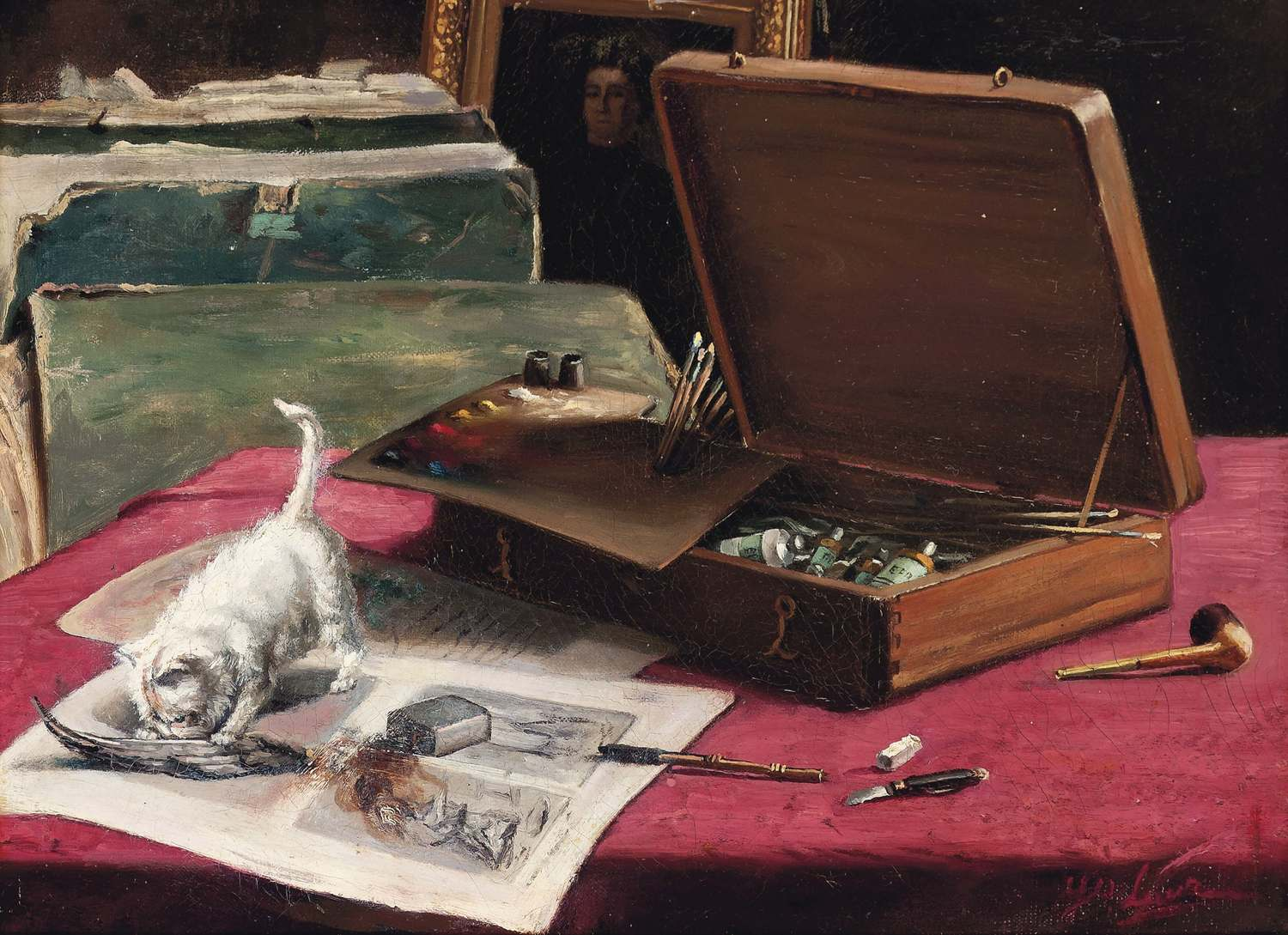
Mischief in the Artist's Studio (Marie Yvonne Laur)

She studied with her father, then with Jean-Léon Gérôme (Vesoul, 1824–1904). After completing her training, she devoted herself to painting domestic animals, mostly cats, and later still lifes, such as fruit and flowers. From 1900, she exhibited in the Salon and in 1908 joined the Salon des artistes français.

In 1934, she was recognised as Peintre de l'Air, a title awarded by the French Minister of Defence to artists who dedicate their talent to aerospace.

From her imprisonment until her death after deportation to the Nazi concentration camp Ravensbrück in 1944, she continued to make drawings of the environment in which she was held captive. Those drawings were buried, exhumed, hidden and then brought back to France by Béatrix de Toulouse-Lautrec (1924–2017), a fellow prisoner and friend of Marie Yvonne Laur.

== Private life ==
In 1912, Marie Yvonne Laur met the aviator and journalist André Bellot (1883–1945). They moved to Algeria together and married on 13 October 1913 in Algiers. After World War I, during which André Bellot had served in the air force, they returned to France. They settled on the Boulevard de Clichy in Paris. Her worked there as a journalist for the newspaper Le Matin while she continued to paint.

In 1934, she joined the lodge Le Droit Humain, the only mixed and international obedience in Freemasonry at the time. She remained a member of Freemasonry until it was banned by the Vichy regime in August 1940.

During World War II, she was arrested in her home by the Gestapo on 24 June 1944, along with several other people suspected of being members of the resistance. During the search, two antique rifles were discovered that had been donated by Charles Nungesser, a famous aviator and friend of the couple.

She was detained at Fresnes prison and then at the Romainville fortress. She was deported to Germany with the convoy of 15 August 1944. She wore the registration number 57772 and the red political triangle. She was sent first to camp Torgau and then to the Nazi concentration camp Ravensbrück. On 1 November 1944, she died there in the Revier, the camp infirmary, at the age of 65.

Her husband survived her, but died in 1945. After the hostilities of September 1939, he was mobilised as a member of the air force in Casablanca, Morocco. He never returned to France and never saw his wife again.

Marie Yvonne Laur was the great-aunt of journalist and writer Marie Charrel, who in 2017 published the novel Je suis ici pour vaincre la nuit. Yo Laur (1879-1944) which was inspired by the artist's life and is the result of research into her life in Paris and Algeria and then her deportation to Ravensbrück.

== Collections ==
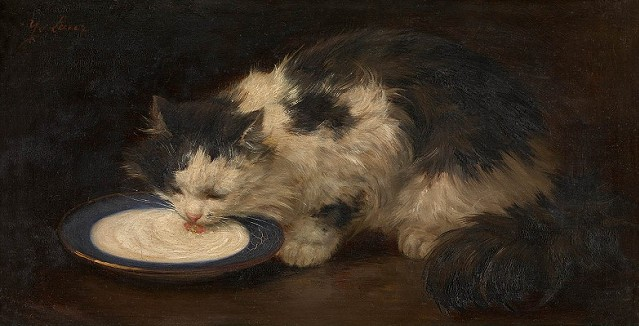
Le bon lait (Marie Yvonne Laur, collection: KMSKA)

Marie Yvonne Laur's oil paintings Who Will Get it? and The Good Milk are part of the collection of KMSKA (Antwerp, Belgium). The Lightner Museum in St Augustine (Florida, USA) also owns a work by Marie Yvonne Laur: Cats, Kittens and Jewelry Chest Still Life (circa 1900).
