= Julie Rodde =

French journalist and writer (1819–1900)

Marie–Julie Rodde
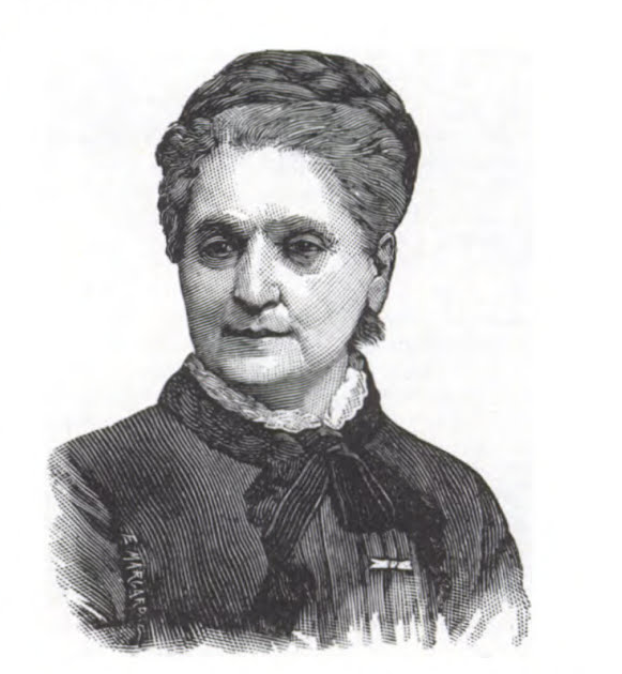
- Born: 18 July 1818; Aubenas, France
- Died: 30 October 1900 (aged 82); Paris, France
- Resting place: Montmartre Cemetery
- Occupations: Journalist, writer, editor
- Spouse: François Fertiault (1814–1915)
- Children: Victor
- Writing career
- Language: French

Marie–Julie Rodde (18 July 1818, Aubenas – 30 October 1900, Paris) was a French writer, poet and journalist.

== Biography ==
Julie Rodde was born into familty of the economist, writer and journalist Jean-François Victor Rodde (1792–1835) and founder of the republican newspaper Le Bon Sens (1832–1839). She married in 1841 the poet François Fertiault (1814–1915), with whom she had a child, Victor, so named "in memory of a father, who died too soon, whom she had loved to the point of adoration".

Julie was editor-in-chief of various magazines, including Modes de l'Enfance and the Journal des jeunes mères, and contributed to many women's magazines, such as Le Conseiller des Dames, la Joie du Foyer, le Journal des Jeunes Filles, la Revue de la Mode, le Moniteur de la Mode, le Bulletin de la Société des Gens de Lettres.

In addition, Julie Rodde wrote song lyrics as well as several collections of poetry, alone and with her husband.

Settled in Paris and close to the Parnassians, the couple worked as editors of the periodical Feuilleton de Paris between 1847 and 1851, then of the Bulletin de l'Union des poètes from 1857 to 1876.

In 1856, when Victor died unexpectedly, Julie was deeply shaken by the death of her only son.

Same year she published, with her husband, of a collection of Le Poème des larmes (1858). Six years later a second collection of poems was published: Les Voix amies (1864).

With her husband, Julie Rodde were members of the Society of the People of Letters.

== Legacy ==
In 1915, the Crozatier Museum in Le Puy-en-Velay (Haute-Loire) received three paintings, donated by François Fertiault (1814–1915): an anonymous portrait of Victor Rodde (1792–1835) and a counterpart representing his daughter Julie Rodde (1820–1900) and her husband, both painted by Félix Auguste Clément (1826–1888).

== Bibliography ==
- Arsène Thévenot, Notice sur Mr et M^{me} Fertiault : leur vie et leurs œuvres, Imprimeries réunies, 1913
- Henry Vaschalde, "M^{me} Julie Fertiault", in Histoire des poètes du Vivarais, Paris, Aubry, 1876, p. 252–253
