= Alfred-Arthur Brunel de Neuville =

French painter

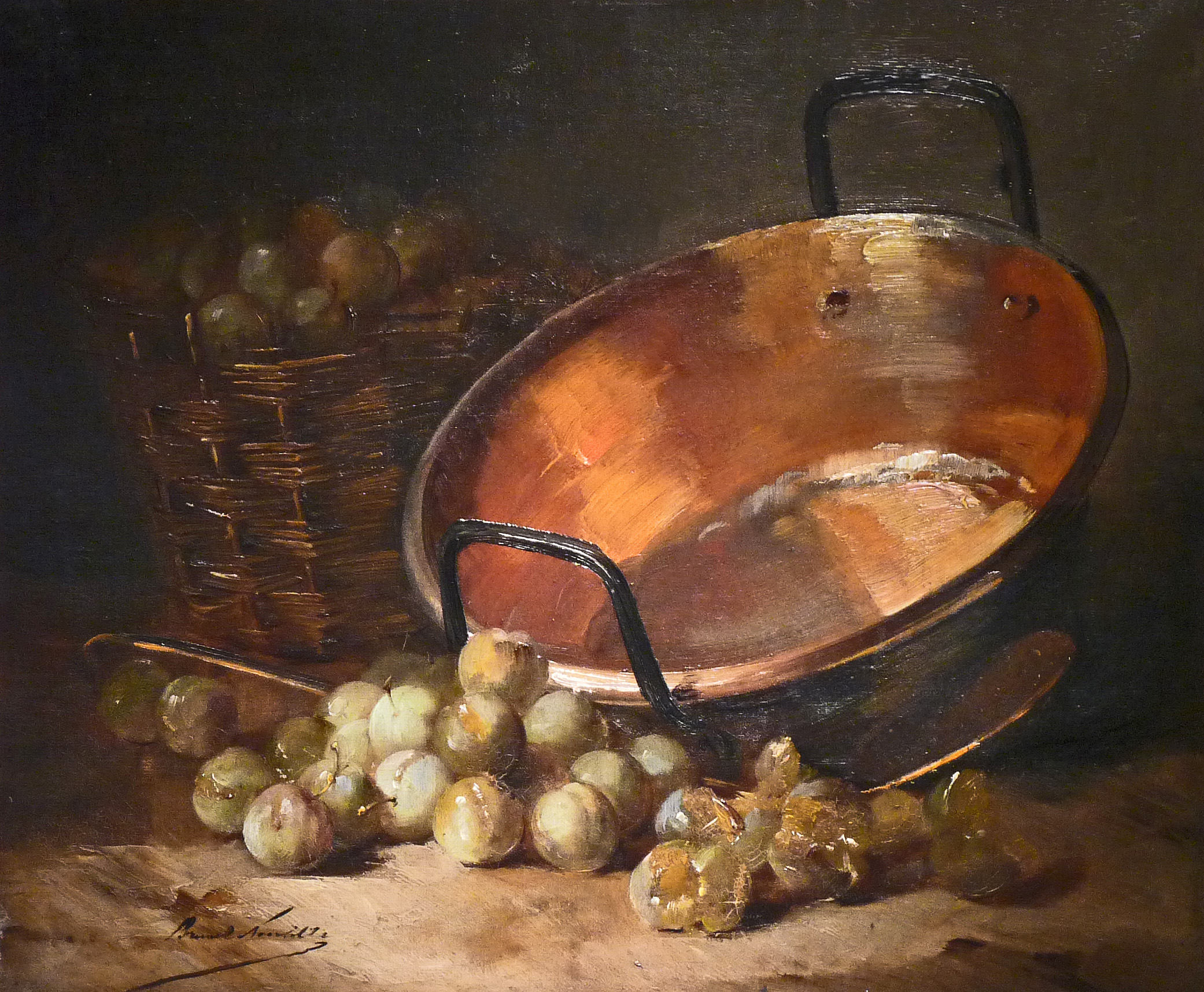
Chaudron et prunes by Alfred-Arthur Brunel de Neuville, oil on canvas, in the Musée Charles de Bruyères, Remiremont

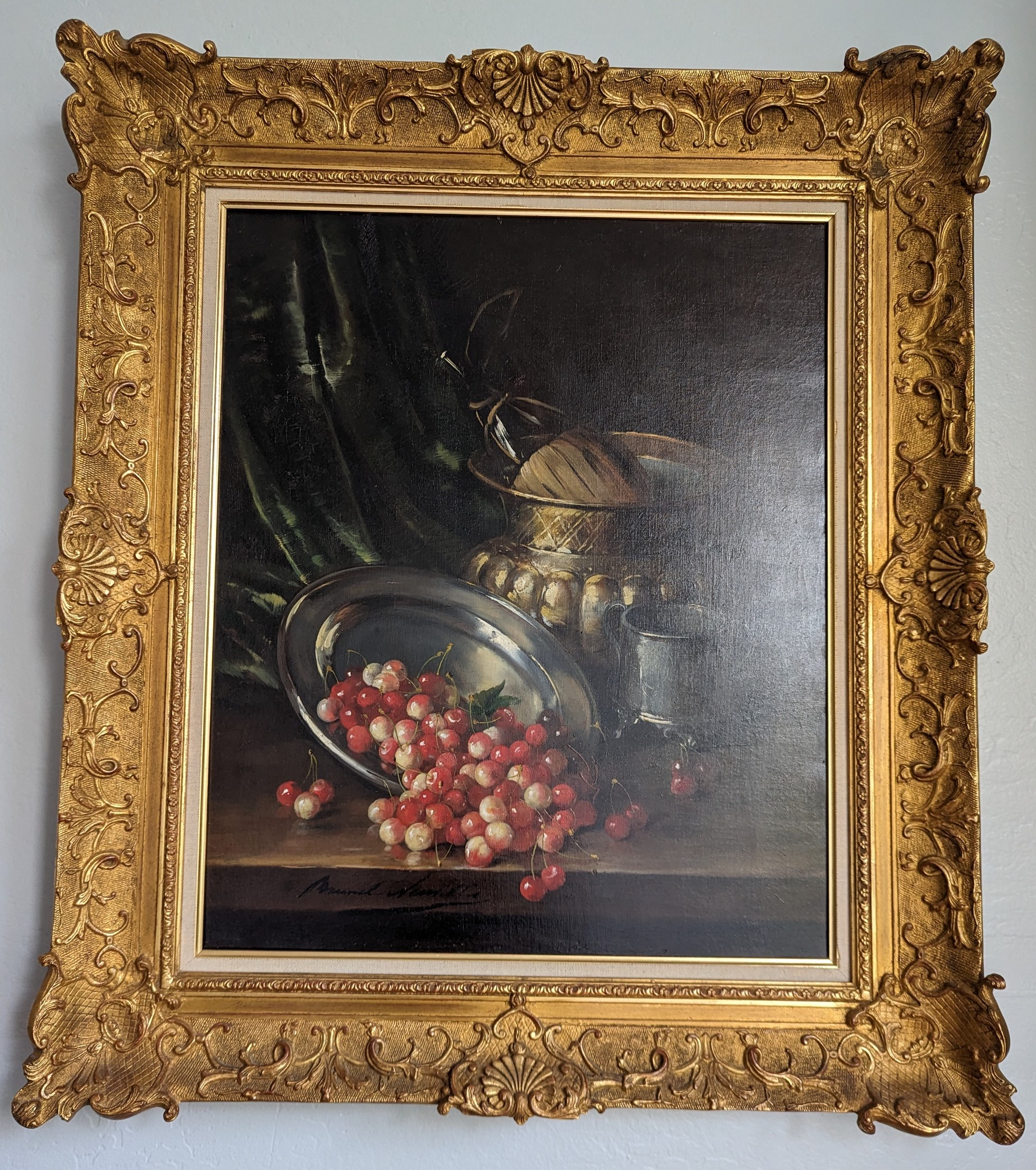
"Assiette de cerises" by Alfred-Arthur Brunel de Neuville, oil on canvas, Private Collection

Alfred-Arthur Brunel de Neuville (1852–1941) was a French painter known mainly for paintings of still life and animals, especially cats. Alfred Arthur Brunel de Neuville was born Alfred Arthur Brunel on 8 December 1852 in Paris to the artist Léon Brunel (1816-1896) and his wife Marie Zénaïe Champenois. Although little is known about his early education, he is believed to have received artistic tuition from his father.

He married Louise Félicité Neuville on 1 September 1877 in Paris and together the couple had 4 children. One of their children was the painter Marie Yvonne Laur. He made his debut at the Paris Salon of 1879 with a still life of apples and grapes, continuing to exhibit there over a number of years. At some point from around 1881 he adopted his wife's maiden name and began signing his works Brunel Neuville. His first painting exhibited at the Paris Salon under the name of Brunel-Neuville was in 1883, entitled 'Langouste' (lobster).

He began exhibiting at the Société des Artistes Français from 1889 and was later elected a member in 1907. He was known to be living at 17 Rue des Carrières in Puteaux, near Paris in 1896 and by 1908 had moved to 35, Rue de Meudon in the Boulogne-Billancourt area of Paris. In addition to still life paintings, Brunel de Neuville also became known for his paintings of animals, mainly cats. It is widely accepted that he painted under several pseudonyms including Florentin de Neuville and Laurence de Neuville. He died in Paris in 1941 and is buried in Montmartre Cemetery.

Today, Brunel de Neuville's paintings can be found in museums at Béziers, Brest, Chateau Thierry, and Louviers.

Brunel de Neuville is buried in Montmartre Cemetery in Paris.

== Sources ==
- Alfred-Arthur Brunel de Neuville at Burlington Paintings.
- Alfred-Arthur Brunel de Neuville at Saighead.com.
