= Julian Klemczyński =

Polish composer

- Born: 1807 or 1810; Kalisz, Poland
- Died: 1851 (aged 41–44)
- Era: Romantic

Julian Klemczyński was a Polish composer and teacher who spent the bulk of his career in France.

== Biography ==
Julian Klemczyński was born in either 1807 or 1810 in the old section (Stare Miasto) of Kalisz, Poland. His father was a musician. He graduated high school in 1825 (today the Adam Asnyka High School) and began the study of law and administration in Warsaw. He joined the secret student society, the Association of Knights of Narcissus. That year he was arrested by the police and put in custody; he was expelled from university in 1827. In 1831 he participated in the November Uprising - he was in the 6th Lancers Brigade under General Maciej Rybiński and was awarded the Cross of the Order of Military Virtue.

1831 was the year Klemczyński emigrated to France, first settling in Meaux, and then in Paris in 1833. Between 1832 and 1837 he was a member of the Polish Democratic Society. He supported himself by giving lessons and through publication of his compositions. He specialized in writing salon music, often fantasies based on themes from opera, writing for solo piano or piano with violin. Twenty music publishers published his work, attesting to his popularity.

He was married to Margaret Louise Thevin with whom he had two children, Homberta and Mary (married surname: Ogez).

He is buried in the Montmartre Cemetery, on the Avenue des Anglais.

== Reception ==
That Klemczyński's music was popular can be inferred from his music being published by twenty different music publishers. Various reviewers writing in the Gazette Musicale de Paris from 1834-35 indicate his music was typical salon music, emphasizing charm and brilliant style, although lacking in originality.

Henri Blanchard, also writing in the Gazette Musicale de Paris took a more critical view. While stressing Klemczyński's idiomatic knowledge of the violin, he found the composer's Fantaisie concertante sur une Cavatine des Puritani de Bellini op. 14 to be "common." Blanchard declared Klemczyński ignorant of musical rules because he composer chose unusual keys for the movements of his string quartet.

Later reviews from 1842 gave a negative review of Klemczyński's entire oeuvre, calling his Impromptus op. 10 worse than those of Frederic Chopin and describing a raw modulation in the duet, op. 45 as "grotesque." The negative reviews probably account for the drop in attention, so that Klemczyński's death went unnoticed in the press.

== Selective list of works ==
=== Opus number known ===
- Op. 10: Deux Impromptus alla Mazourka (piano)
- Op. 11: Mazourka en Forme de Rondoletto (piano, 4-hands)
- Op. 12: Souvenirs d’Allemagne: Valses (piano)
- Op. 14: Fantaisie concertante sur une Cavatine des Puritani de Bellini (violin, piano)
- Op. 18: Variations sur un Romance de Labarré (piano)
- Op. 20: Les chaperons blancs: nocturne concertant
- Op. 23: Variations sur une thème des Puritains (piano, 4-hands)
- Op. 24: Duo sur Acteon (violin, piano)
- Op. 27: Duo brillant sur des motifs favoris de l'opéra Le domino noir (violin, piano)
- Op. 29: Sérénade brillante sur des motifs favoris de "Mar-guerite" d'Adrien Boïeldieu
- Op. 32: Le garde française: grande valse (violin, piano)
- Op. 34: Fantaisie brillante Sur la Romance du Saule [d'Othello] (piano)
- Op. 36: Fantaisie brillante sur la Vendetta de H. de Ruolz (violin, piano)
- Op. 37: Divertissement sur l'opéra les Martyrs de Donizetti (violin, piano)
- Op. 38: No. 1: Duettino facile sur La Fille du régiment de G. Donizetti (violin, piano)
- Op. 38: No. 2: Les charmes d'Italie: trois divertissements concertants brillants e faciles sur des motifs italiens (violin, piano)
- Op. 43: La Foruarina, 4e Grande valse salon (violin, piano)
- Op. 44: La Joconde grande valse de salon (violin, piano)
- Op. 45: Duo sur Les diamans de la Couronne (flute, piano)
- Op. 50: Fantaisie brillante Sur les motifs italiens [de] Straniera, Torquato Tasso, et Elidire d'Amore (piano)
- Op. 53: La Mystérieuse: 7e grande valse brillante (piano)
- Op. 54: Duo sur la Part du Diable, Opéra de D.F.E. Auber (violin, piano)
- Op. 55: Romanesca de le Part du Diable (piano)
- Op. 56: Valse brillant (piano)
- Op. 59: La Brise du soir: 9e grande valse brillante (piano)
- Op. 60: Nocturne concertant Cendrillon, opéra de Nicolo (violin, piano)
- Op. 64: Duo brillant sur "Moïse", opéra de G. Rossini (violin, piano)
- Op. 65: Fernanda. 11e grande valse (piano)
- Op. 66: Duo brillant sur Robert Bruce, Opéra de G. Rossini (violin, piano)
- Op. 70: Nocturne caractéristique (piano)
- Op. 71: Duo brillant sur des motifs de Haÿdée, opéra de D.F.E. Auber (violin, piano)
- Op. 72: La Mobile: Polka populaire (piano)
- Op. 74: Duo brillant sur "Le Violon du Diable", ballet de Pugny (violin, piano)
- Op. 77: La Perle de Paris: Valse (violin, piano)

=== Opus number unknown ===
- Fantaisie sur Richard coeur de lion, de Grétry
- La Favorite: Mazourka nationale (piano)
- Les jeunes Rivales. N° 1: L'Espiègle (violin, piano)
- Les Marionnettes: Quadrille (piano)
- Mlle. de La Vallière: grande valse brillante (piano)
- Le petit Ramoneur: Quadrille (piano)
- Les petits Voyageurs. Quadrille brillant (piano)
- La Séduisante. 6e grande valse brillante (piano)
- Trois morceaux aux Abonnées du Trésor des Demoiselles
  - 1: Alise : dernière polka / Jean Strauss.
  - 2: Souvenir de la nouvelle Orleans / J.D. Bailly.
  - 3: La Parisienne : polka
- Valse de la Princesse Hélène (piano)
- Vert-Vert: Quadrille (piano)

== See also ==
- Adam Asnyka High School (on Polish Wikipedia)
- Maciej Rybiński (General) (on Polish Wikipedia)

== Sources consulted ==
- Blanchard, Henri (1839). "Revue critique". Revue et Gazette Musicale de Paris (in French). 6 (15). Paris: 18.
- Chmara-Żaczkiewicz, Barbara (1997). "Julian Klemczyński". Encyklopedia muzyczna PWM. Vol. 5. Kraków: Polskie Wydawn. Muzyczne. pp. 102–103. ISBN 8322433034.
- Chechlińska, Zofia. Oxford Music Online: Grove Music Online. Oxford University Press.
- Krosnowski, Adolphe Tabasz (1837–1838). Almanach historique ou souvenir de l'émigration polonaise. Paris: La Librairie Polonaise.

=== Bibliography ===
- Gazeta Polska 1831, no 18.
- Gazette Musicale de Paris, 1834, no. 51, 1835, nos. 19, 20, 37.
- Revue et Gazette Musicale de Paris, 1836, no. 27.
- Revue et Gazette Musicale de Paris, 1842 no 37.
- H. Blanchard, "Revue critique," Revue et Gazette Musicale de Paris 1836 no. 36
- H. Blanchard, "Revue critique," Revue et Gazette Musicale de Paris 1839 no. 15 oraz Les deux Polonais, j.w. 1842 nr 11;
- Z Paryża, Gazeta Wielkiego Księstwa Poznańskiego 1837, no. 300.
- A. Sowiński, Les musiciens polonais et slaves, Paryż 1857.
- W. Zwierkowski '"Groby polskie wspólne i oddzielne na cmentarzu paryskim du nord, Montmartre," Przegląd rzeczy polskich 22 III 1858.
- F. Pazdirek, Universal-Handbuch der Musik-Literatur, 1904-10, reprinted Hildesheim 1967.
- J. Bieliński, Królewski Uniwersytet Warszawski (1816–1831), t. 1, Wwa 1907.
- S. Małachowski "Kawalerowie Narcyza," Ziemia Kaliska 1958 no. 6.
- M. Tyrowicz, Towarzystwo Demokratyczne Polskie 1832-1863. Przewodnik biobibliograficzny, Wwa 1964.
- R. Gerber, Studenci Uniwersytetu Warszawskiego 1808-1831, słownik biograf., Wrocław 1977.
- A. Biernat, S. Górzyński, P. Ugniewski, Inskrypcje grobów polskich na cmentarzach w Paryżu red. A. Biernat, Wwa 1986.
