= Montmartre Cemetery =

Cemetery in Paris, France

Coordinates: 48°53′16″N 2°19′49″E

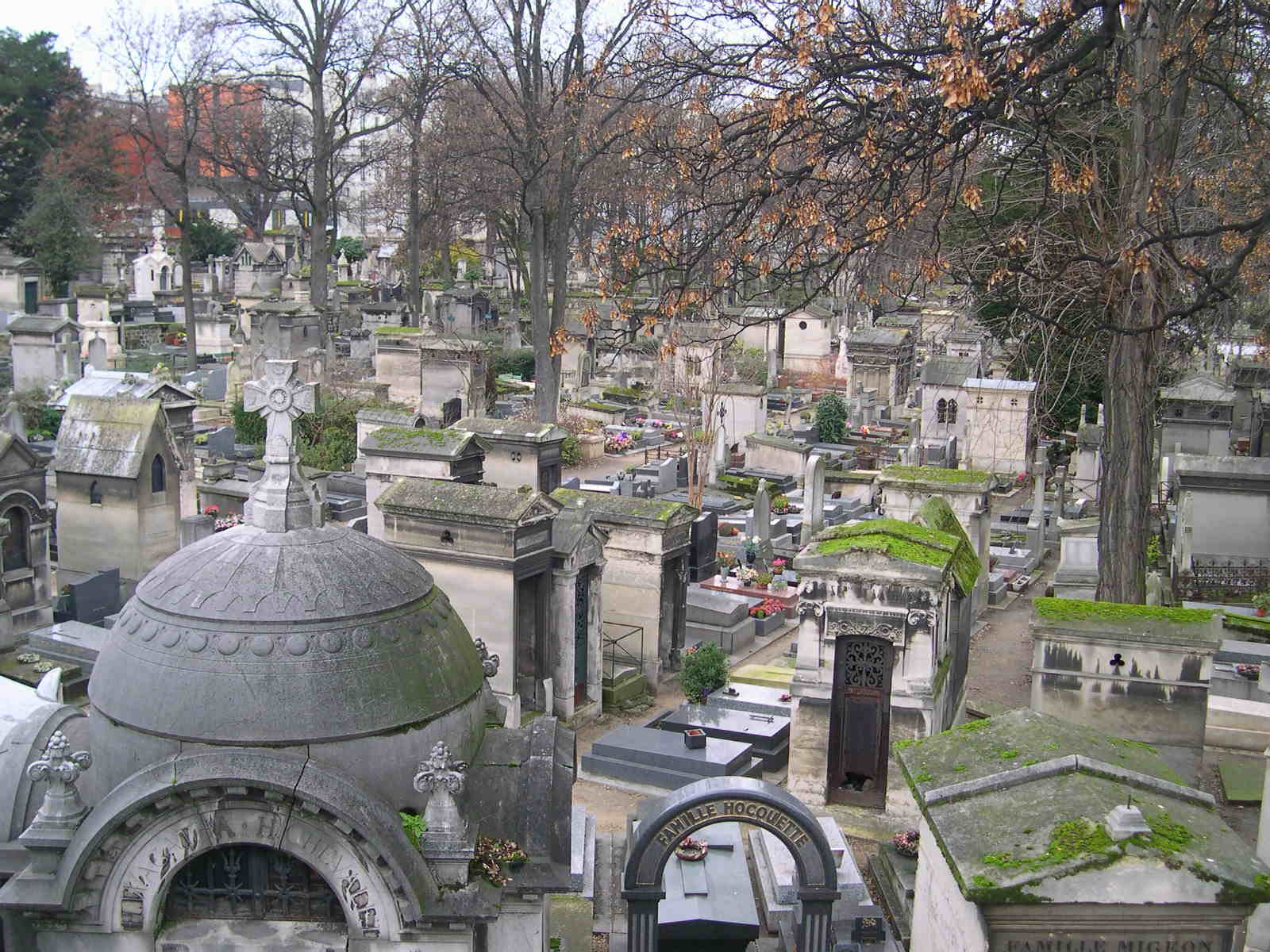
A view of Montmartre Cemetery

The Cemetery of Montmartre (French: Cimetière de Montmartre) is a cemetery in the 18th arrondissement of Paris, France, that dates to the early 19th century. Officially known as the Cimetière du Nord, it is the third largest necropolis in Paris, after the Père Lachaise Cemetery and the Montparnasse Cemetery.

== History ==
In the mid-18th century, overcrowding in the cemeteries of Paris had created numerous problems, from impossibly high funeral costs to unsanitary living conditions in the surrounding neighborhoods. In the 1780s, the Cimetière des Innocents was officially closed and citizens were banned from burying corpses within the city limits of Paris. During the early 19th century, new cemeteries were constructed outside the precincts of the capital: Montmartre in the north, Père Lachaise Cemetery in the east, Passy Cemetery in the west and Montparnasse Cemetery in the south.

The Montmartre Cemetery was opened on 1 January 1825. It was initially known as le Cimetière des Grandes Carrières (Cemetery of the Large Quarries). The name referenced the cemetery's unique location, in an abandoned gypsum quarry. The quarry had previously been used during the French Revolution as a mass grave. It was built below street level, in the hollow of an abandoned gypsum quarry located west of the Butte near the beginning of Rue Caulaincourt in Place de Clichy. As is still the case today, its sole entrance was constructed on Avenue Rachel under Rue Caulaincourt.

A popular tourist destination, Montmartre Cemetery is the final resting place of many famous artists who lived and worked in the Montmartre area.

== Notable interments ==
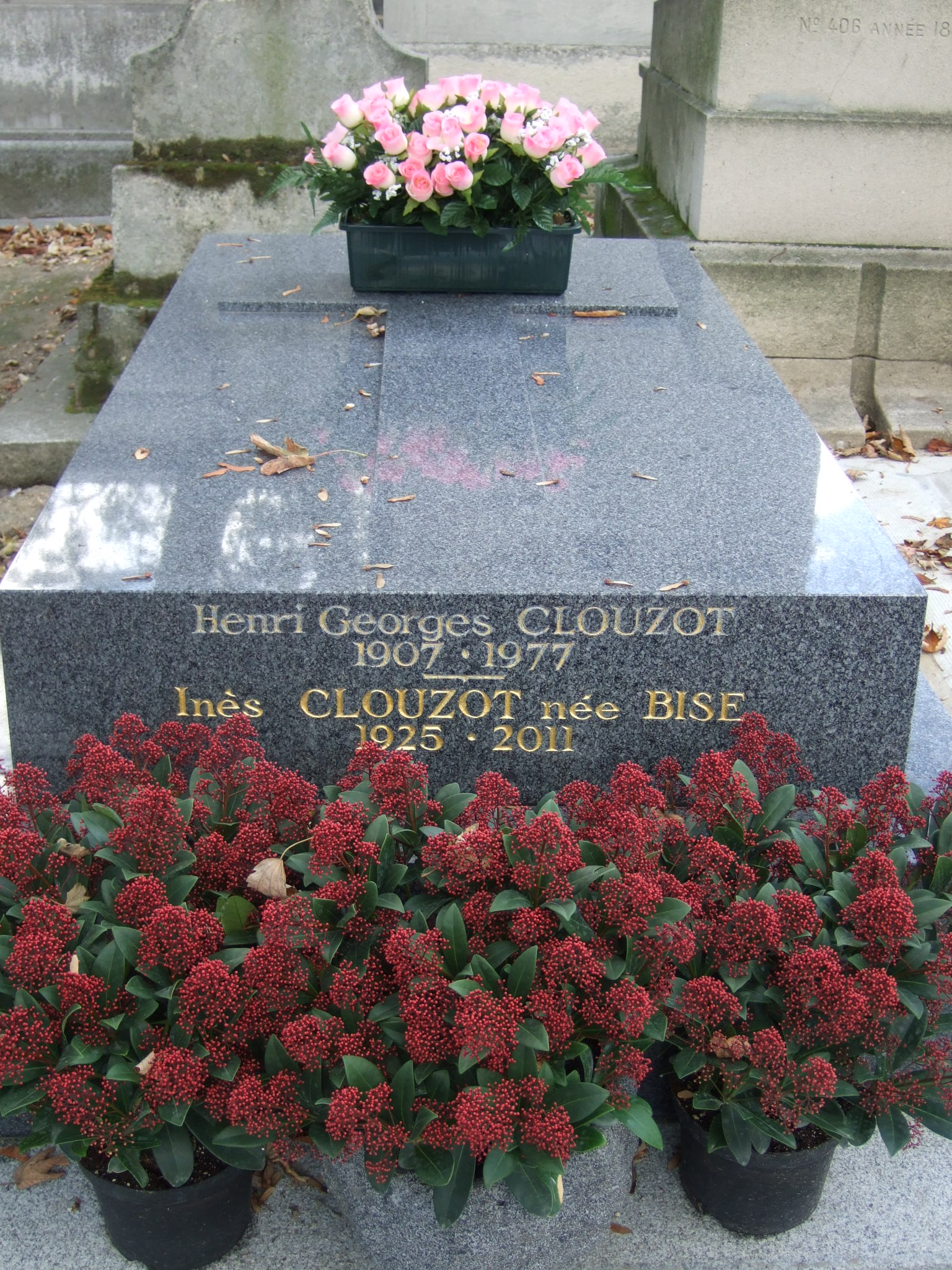
Henri-Georges Clouzot's grave

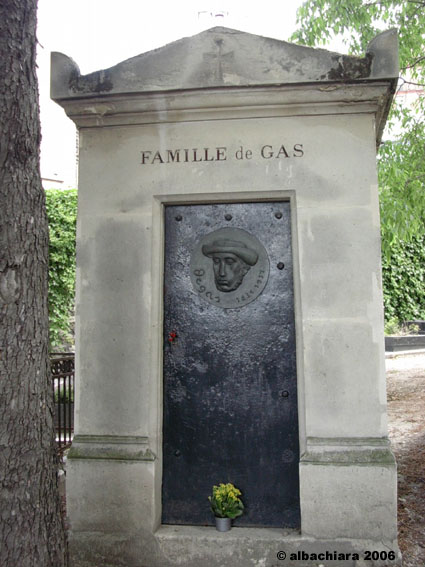
Tomb of Edgar Degas

The tomb of Alexandre Dumas, fils

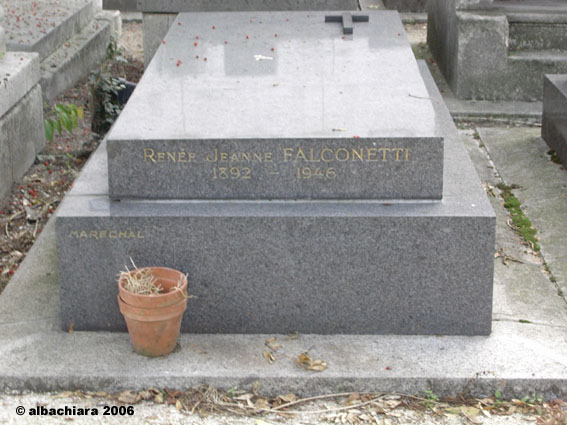
Renée Jeanne Falconetti

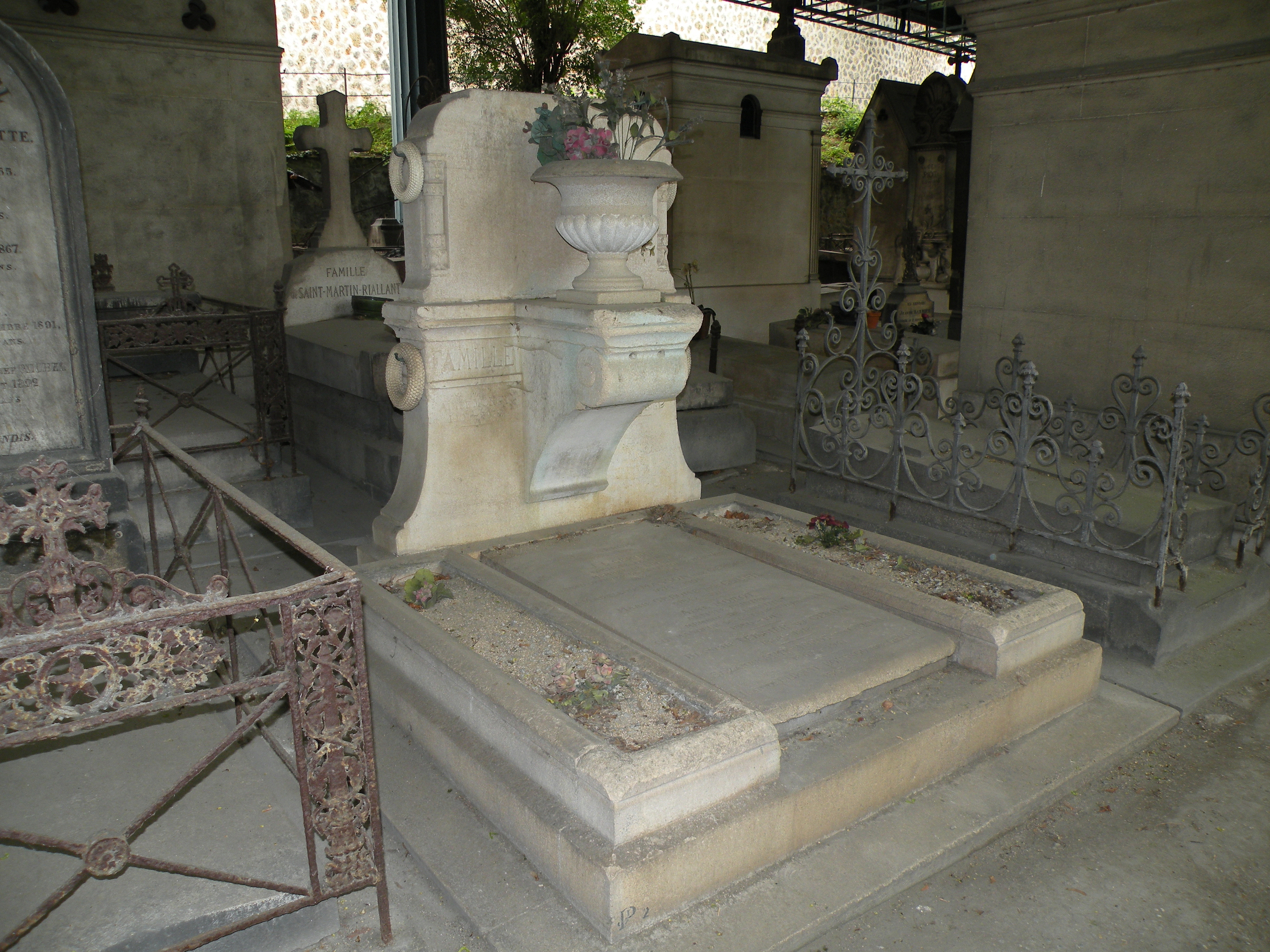
Grave of Jean Léon Gérôme, Aimé Morot and family (Cimetière de Montmartre, 18th division)

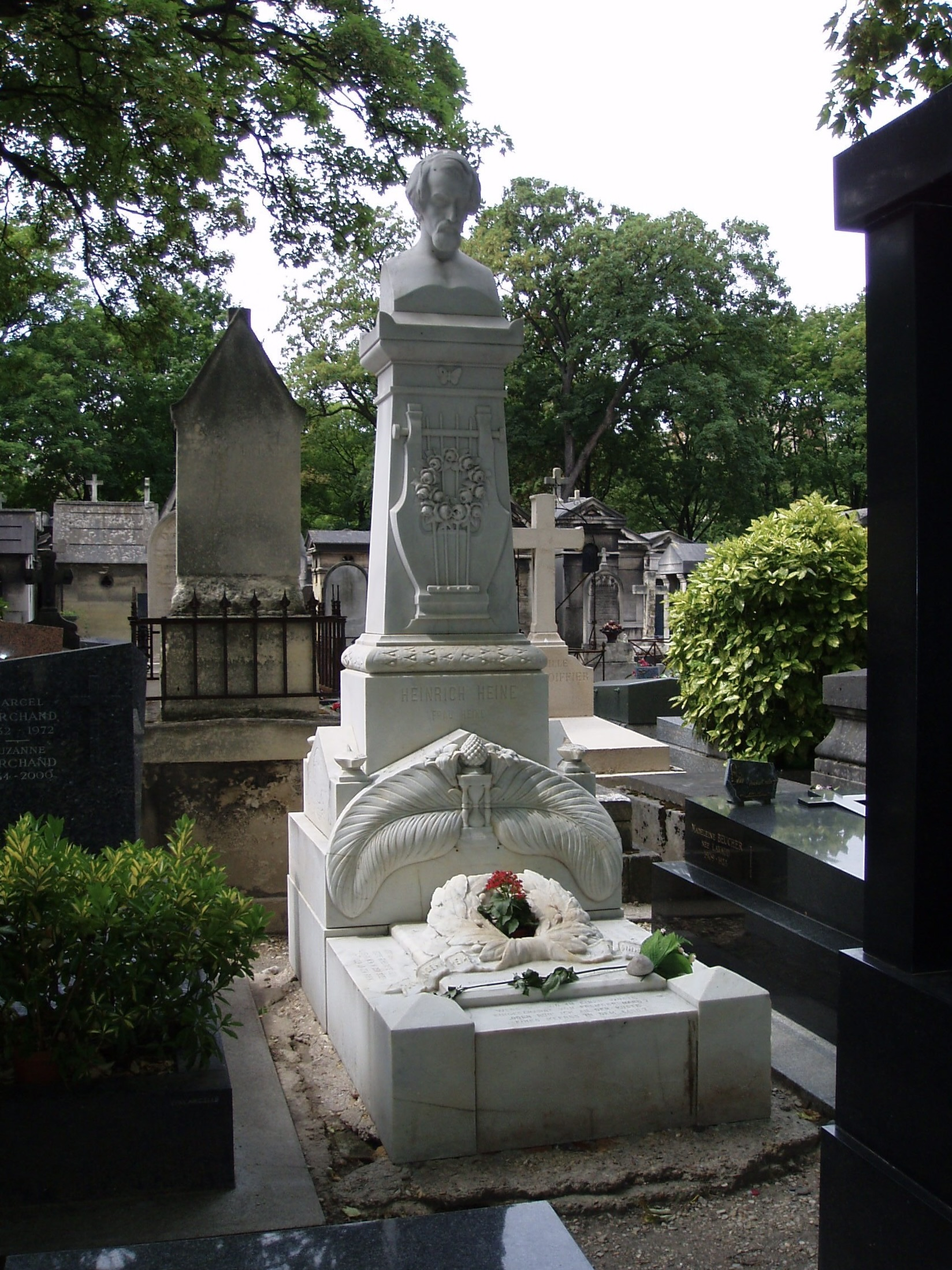
Heinrich Heine

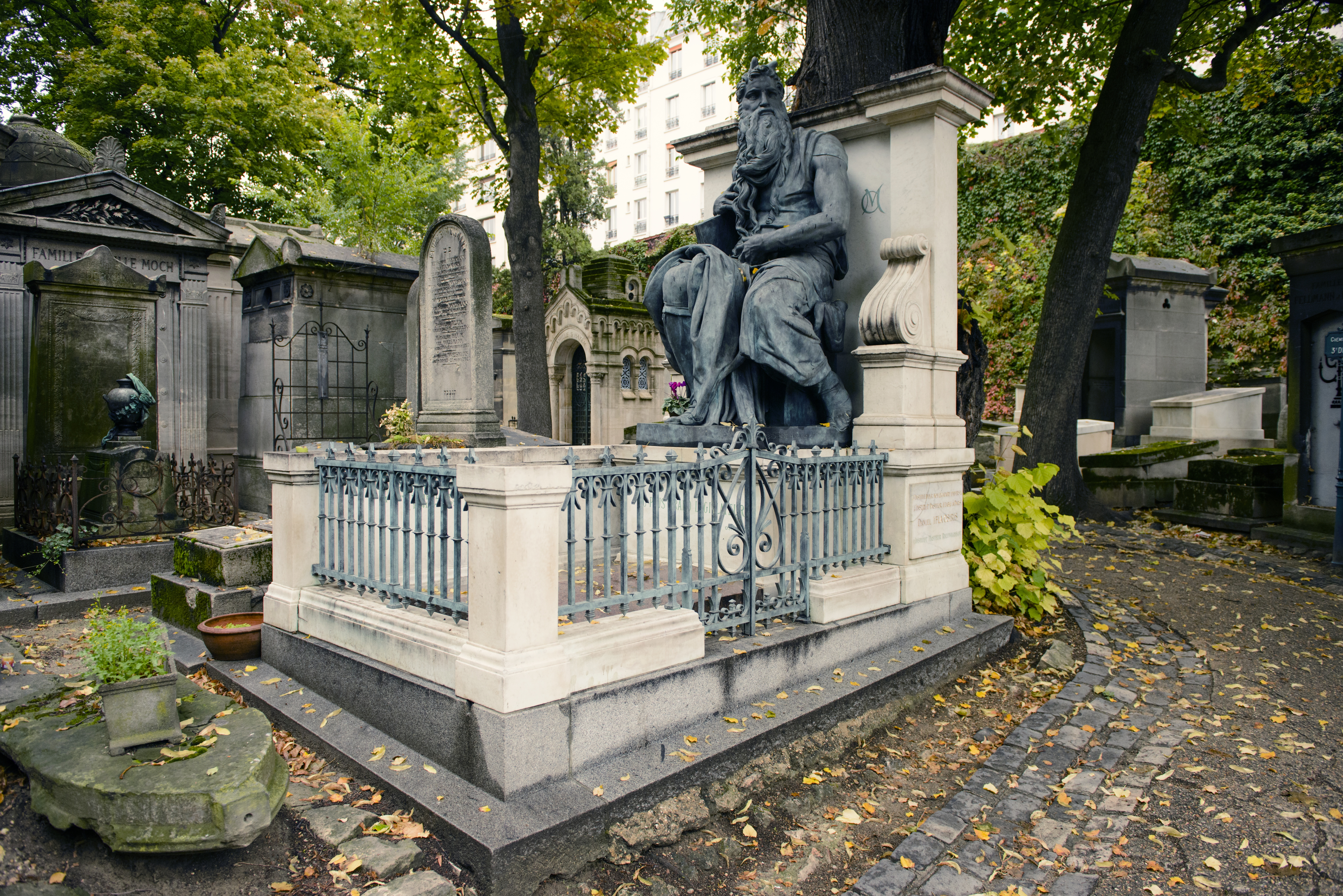
Daniel Iffla

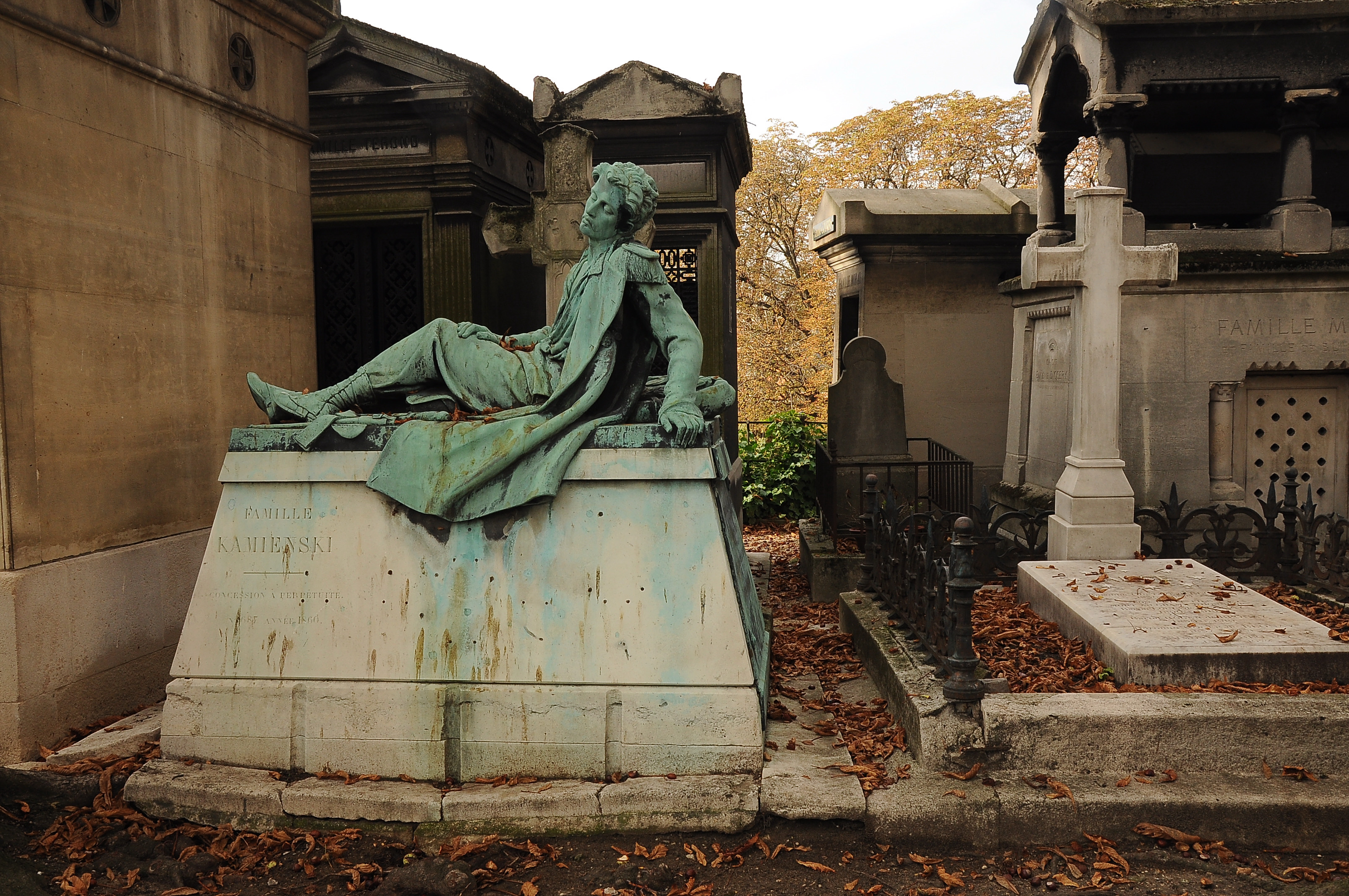
Statue on the tomb of Miecislas Kamieński

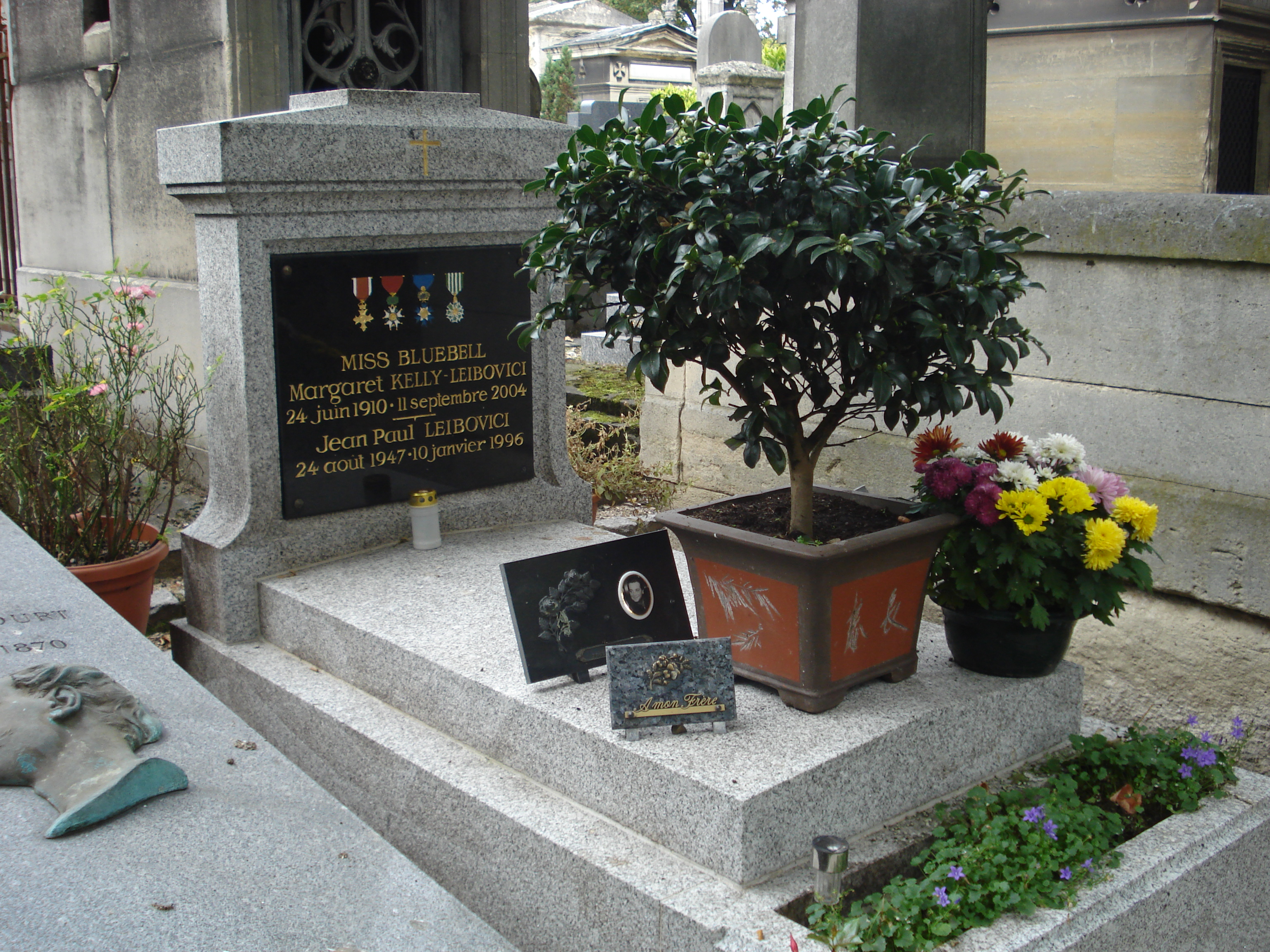
Margaret Kelly Leibovici

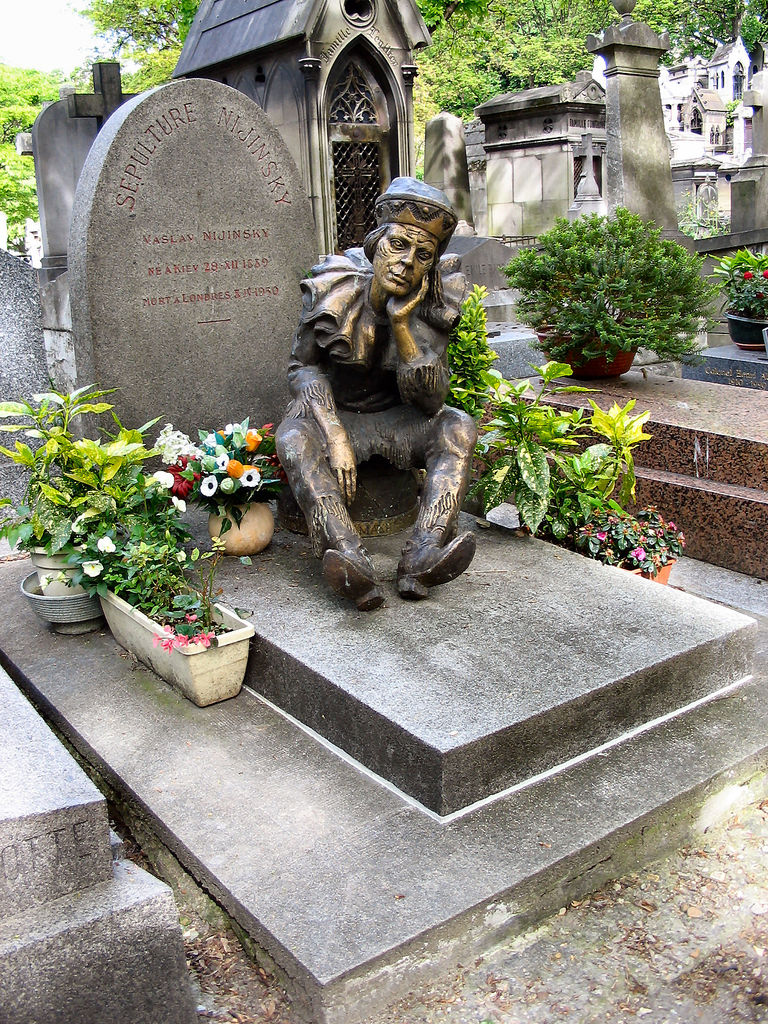
Tombstone of Vaslav Nijinsky in Cimetière de Montmartre in Paris. The statue shows Nijinsky as the puppet Petrouchka.

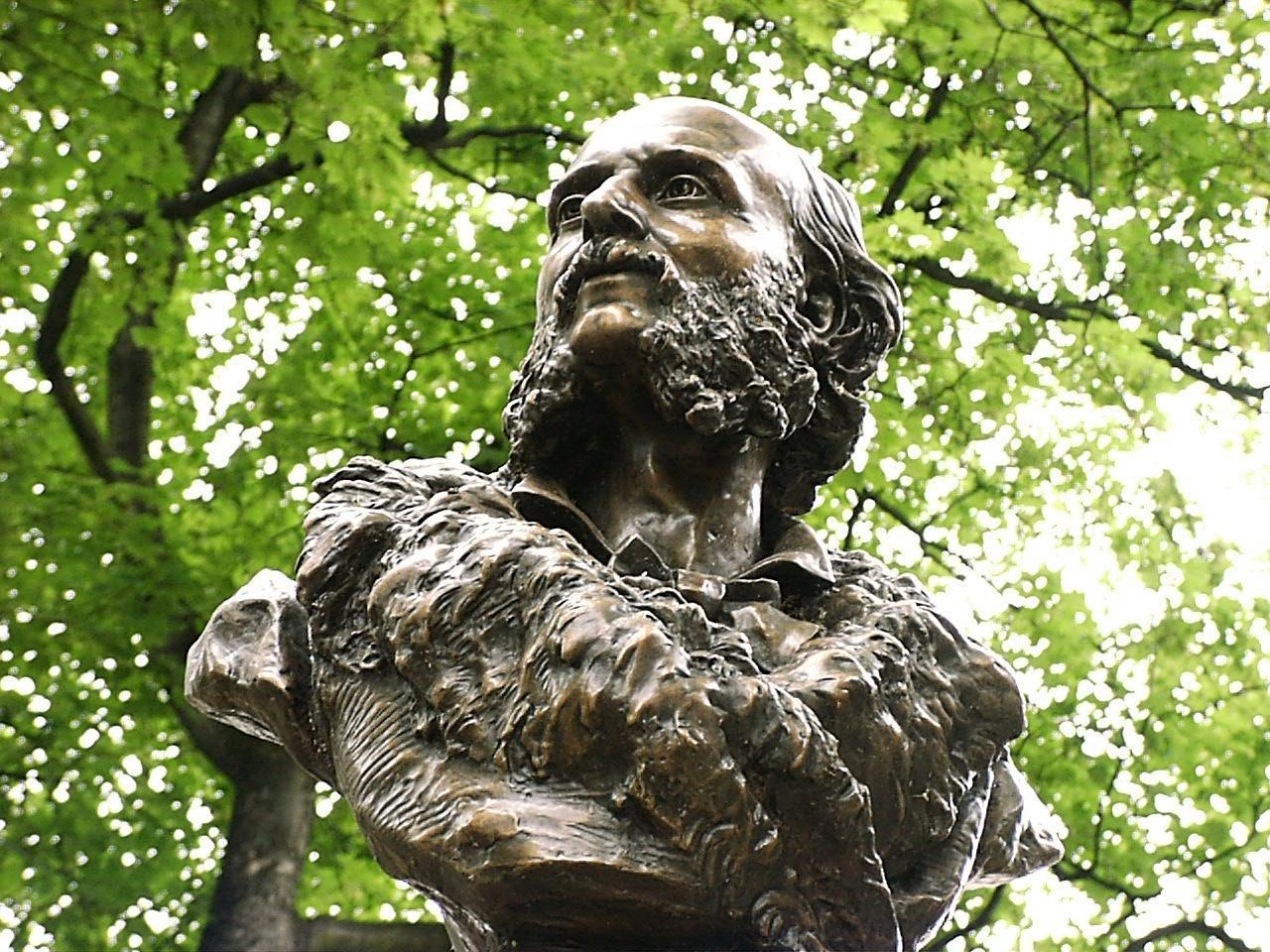
Tomb of Jacques Offenbach.

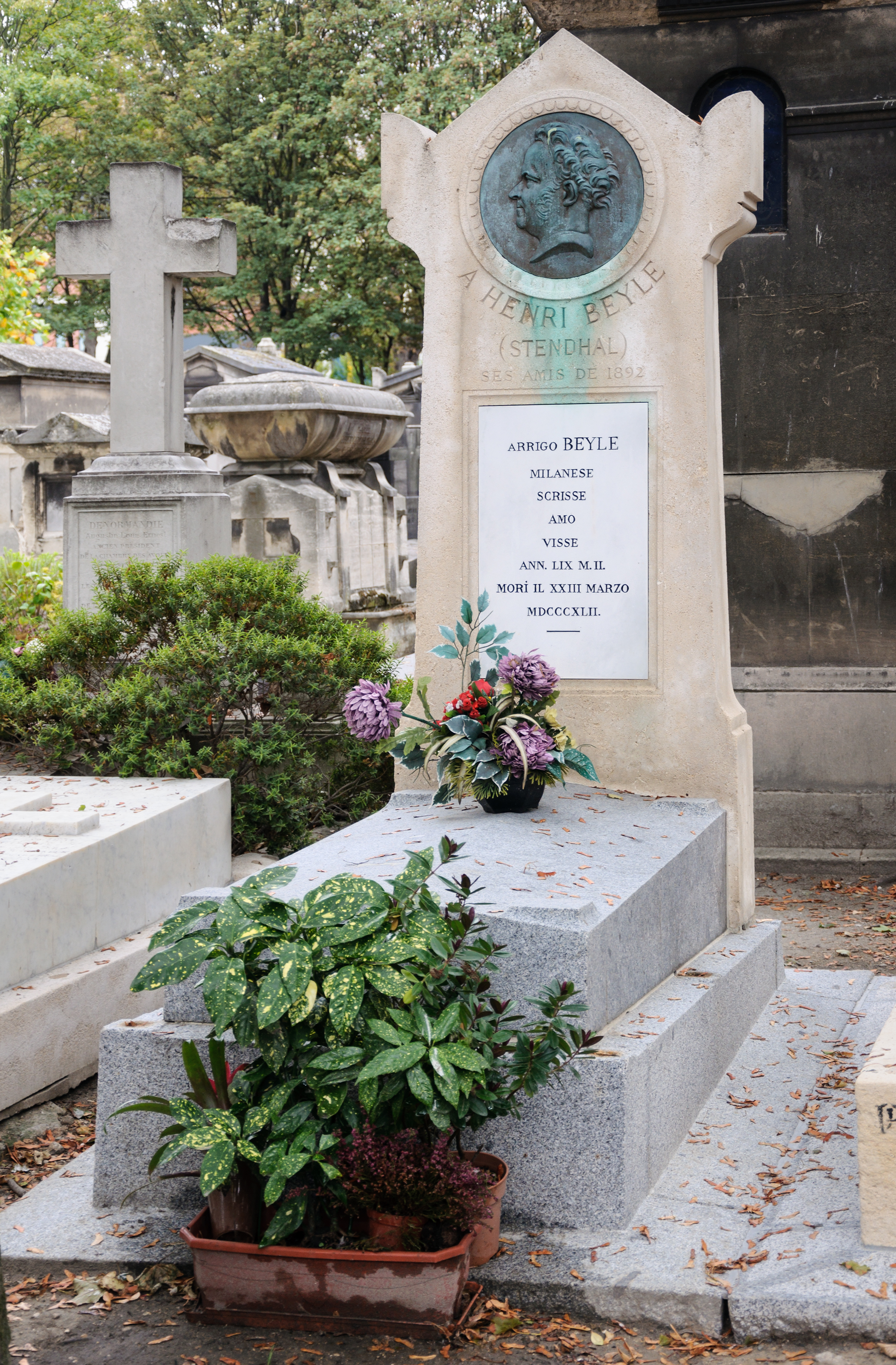
Tomb of Stendhal

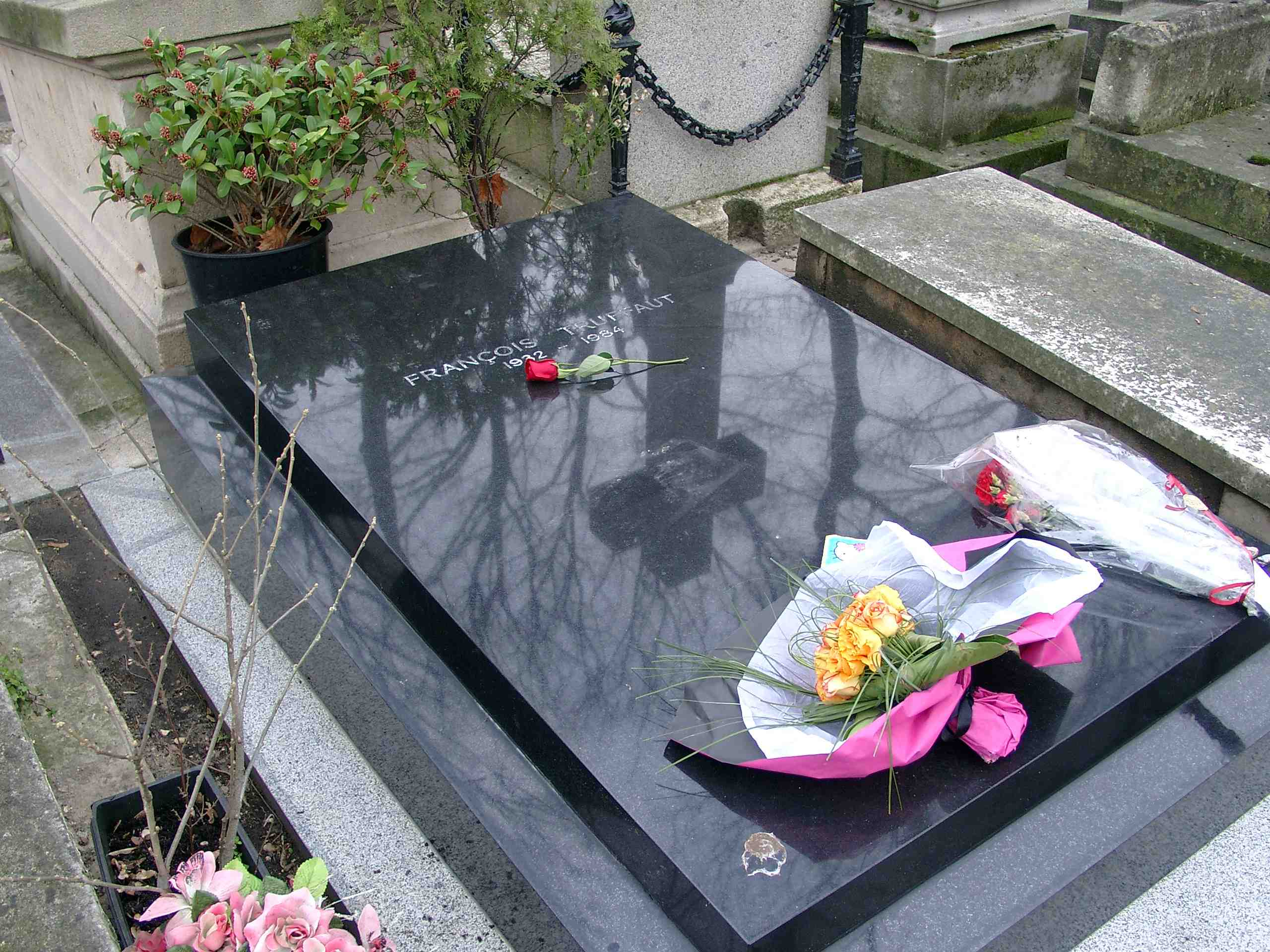
François Truffaut

- Adolphe Adam (1803–1856), composer
- Yvette Alde (1911–1967), painter
- Charles-Valentin Alkan (1813–1888), composer
- André-Marie Ampère (1775–1836), physicist (namesake of electrical unit ampere)
- Édouard André (1840–1911), landscape architect
- Chloé Ansel (2006–2015), murder victim
- Juan Crisóstomo Arriaga (1806–1826), composer
- Alfred-Arthur Brunel de Neuville (1852–1941), painter
- Benjamin Ball (physician) (1833–1893), psychiatrist
- Jean-Baptiste Le Moyne de Bienville (1680–1767), explorer, governor, founder of New Orleans
- Michel Berger (1947–1992), composer, singer
- Hector Berlioz (1803–1869), composer (originally buried in a less prominent plot in the same cemetery)
- Léon Boëllmann (1862–1897), composer and organist
- Alexandre Boëly (1785–1858), composer and organist
- Mélanie "Mel" Bonis (1858–1937), composer
- François Claude Amour, marquis de Bouillé (1739–1800), royalist general named in the French National Anthem, La Marseillaise
- Lili Boulanger (1893–1918), composer
- Nadia Boulanger (1887–1979), composer
- Georges Hilaire Bousquet (1846–1937), jurist, legal scholar
- Marcel Boussac (1889–1980), entrepreneur
- Giuseppina Bozzacchi, (1853–1870), ballerina
- Victor Brauner (1903–1966), painter
- Václav Brožík (1851–1901), Czech painter
- Alfred-Arthur Brunel de Neuville (1852–1941), painter
- Myles Byrne (1780–1862), Irish revolutionary soldier
- Moïse de Camondo (1860–1935), banker
- Nissim de Camondo (1892–1917), banker, World War I pilot
- Aimée Campton (1882–1930), actress
- Pierre Cardin (1922–2020), Fashion Designer
- Marie-Antoine Carême (1784–1833), famed inventor of classical cuisine
- Louis-Eugène Cavaignac (1802–1857), politician
- Fanny Cerrito (1817–1909), Italian ballerina
- Jean-Martin Charcot (1825–1893), neurologist
- Jacques Charon (1920–1975), actor
- Théodore Chassériau (1819–1856), painter
- Henri-Georges Clouzot (1907–1977), director and screenwriter
- Véra Clouzot (1913–1960), actress
- Henri-Bernard Dabadie (1797–1853), operatic baritone
- Zulmé Dabadie (1795–1877), operatic soprano
- Dalida (1933–1987), Egyptian-born Italo-French singer and actress
- Louis Antoine Debrauz de Saldapenna (1811–1871), Austrian writer and diplomat
- Edgar Degas (1834–1917), Impressionist painter, sculptor
- Léo Delibes (1836–1891), composer of Romantic music
- Maria Deraismes (1828–1894), social reformer, feminist
- Narcisse Virgilio Díaz (1808–1876), painter
- William Didier-Pouget (1864–1959), artist painter
- Maxime Du Camp (1822–1894), author
- Norbert Dufourcq (1904–1990), organist, musicologist, writer
- Alexandre Dumas, fils (1824–1895), novelist, playwright
- Marie Duplessis (1824–1847), courtesan, The Lady of the Camellias
- François Duprat (1941–1978), assassinated political radical
- Renée Jeanne Falconetti (1892–1946), actress, notable for La Passion de Jeanne d'Arc.
- Georges Feydeau (1862–1921), playwright of La Belle Époque
- Léon Foucault (1819–1868), scientist
- Charles Fourier (1772–1837), utopian socialist
- Christopher Fratin (1801–1864), animalier sculptor
- Carole Fredericks (1952–2001), African-American singer
- France Gall (1947–2018), singer
- Theophile Gautier (1811–1872), poet, novelist
- Jean-Léon Gérôme (1824–1904), painter
- Eugène Gigout (1844–1925), composer and organist
- José Melchor Gomis (1791–1836), Spanish Romantic composer
- Edmond de Goncourt (1822–1896), author/publisher, brother of Jules (patron of the Prix Goncourt)
- Jules de Goncourt (1830–1870), author/publisher, brother of Edmond and buried in the same grave. Also patron of the Prix Goncourt
- Amédée Gordini (1899–1979), Gordini sports car manufacturer
- La Goulue (Louise Weber) (1866–1929), Can-can dancer (she was originally buried in the Cimetière de Pantin)
- Jean-Baptiste Greuze (1725–1805), artist
- Béla Grünwald (1839–1891), Hungarian historian and politician
- Jules Guérin (1860–1910), nationalist political radical
- Lucien Guitry (1860–1925), actor
- Sacha Guitry (1885–1957), actor/director
- Charles Gumery (1827–1871), sculptor
- Fromental Halévy (1799–1862), composer
- Heinrich Heine (1797–1856), German poet
- Fanny Heldy (1888–1973), Belgian soprano
- Jacques Ignace Hittorff (1792–1867), architect
- François-André Isambert (1792–1857), lawyer, historian, and politician
- Daniel Iffla (1825–1907), Jewish philanthropist and financier
- Maurice Jaubert (1900–1940), composer, conductor
- André Jolivet (1905–1974), composer
- Marcel Jouhandeau (1888–1979), author
- Louis Jouvet (1887–1951), actor
- Anna Judic (1850–1911), actress, chanteuse
- Antoine-Henri Jomini (1779–1869), general, military author
- Friedrich Kalkbrenner (1784–1849), pianist, composer
- Miecislas Kamieński, a Polish soldier who was a volunteer in the French Army and was killed in the Battle of Magenta, mentioned because the statue by Jules Franceschi
- Julian Klemczyński, (1807 or 1810–1851?), pianist, composer
- Marie-Pierre Kœnig (1898–1970), Free French Field Marshal
- Bernard-Marie Koltès (1948–1989), playwright, director
- Joseph Kosma (1905–1969), composer
- Slavko Kopač (1913–1995), Croatian-French painter, sculptor and poet
- Eugène Labiche (1815–1888), dramatist
- Dominique Laffin (1952–1985), actress
- Charles Lamoureux (1834–1899), violinist
- Jean Lannes (1769–1809), Marshal of France (heart-burial only, the body is in the Pantheon)
- Jules Joseph Lefebvre (1836–1911), painter
- Margaret Kelly Leibovici (1910–2004), "Miss Bluebell", Irish dancer
- Frédérick Lemaître (1800–1876), actor
- Pauline Leroux (1809–1891), dancer
- Élisabeth Leseur (1866–1914), mystic
- José Yves Limantour (1854–1935) Mexican Secretary of Finance
- Emma Livry (1842–1863), ballet dancer
- Édouard Lucas (1842–1891), mathematician
- Aimé Maillart (1817–1871), composer
- Henri Meilhac (1830–1897), dramatist
- Mary Marquet (1895–1979), actress
- Victor Massé (1822–1884), composer
- Auguste de Montferrand (1786–1858), architect
- José María Luis Mora (1794–1850), Mexican politician
- Gustave Moreau (1826–1898), symbolist painter
- Jeanne Moreau (1928–2017), actress
- Aimé Morot (1850–1913), academic art painter
- Henri Murger (1822–1861), novelist
- Musidora (1889–1957), (Jeanne Roques) actress/director/writer
- Vaslav Nijinsky (1890–1950), ballet dancer
- Suzanne Noël (1878–1954), first female plastic surgeon in the world.
- Adolphe Nourrit (1802–1839), tenor
- Eugène Nyon (1812–1870), playwright and novelist
- Alphonse de Neuville (1836–1885), painter whose funerary monument was realized by Francis de Saint-Vidal
- Jacques Offenbach (1819–1880), French composer of German descent
- Georges Ohnet (1848–1919), writer
- Harriet Osborne O'Hagan (1830–1921), Irish portrait artist
- Théophile-Jules Pelouze (1807–1867), chemist
- Isaac Péreire (1806–1880), financier
- Jacob Rodrigues Péreire (1715–1780), educator
- Francis Picabia (1879–1953), painter
- Alphonsine Plessis (1824–1847), La Dame aux Camélias
- Patrick Pons (1952–1980), motorcycle racer
- Pierre Alexis Ponson du Terrail (1829–1871), novelist
- William Didier-Pouget (1864-1959), painter
- Jean Le Poulain (1924–1988), actor
- Francisque Poulbot (1879–1946), painter, illustrator
- Olga Preobrajenska (1871–1962), ballet dancer (according to other sources, she is buried in the Sainte-Geneviève-des-Bois Russian Cemetery)
- Juliette Récamier (1777–1849), socialite and woman of letters
- Suzanne Reichenberg (1853–1924), actress
- Salomon Reinach (1858–1932), archaeologist
- Ernest Renan (1823–1892), writer (buried in the Ary Scheffer grave)
- Jacques Rigaut (1898–1929), poet
- Jacques Rivette (1928–2016), film director and film critic
- Henri Rivière (1827–1883), naval officer, writer
- Jean Rédélé (1922–2007), automotive pioneer, pilot and founder of the French automotive brand Alpine.
- Julie Rodde (1818–1900), French writer, poet and journalist.
- Hilda Roosevelt (1881–1965), opera singer, daughter of Cornelius Roosevelt (1847–1902)
- Endre Rozsda (1913–1999), surrealist painter
- Joseph Isidore Samson (1793–1871), actor and playwright
- Henri Sauguet (1901–1989), composer
- Adolphe Sax (1814–1894), musical instrument artisan (inventor of saxophone)
- Ary Scheffer (1795–1858), painter
- Cornélia Scheffer (1830–1899), sculptor and designer
- Helen G. Scott (1915–1987), Truffaut / Hitchcock
- Philippe Paul de Ségur, Count of Ségur (1780–1873), historian
- Claude Simon (1913–2005), novelist
- Juliusz Słowacki (1809–1849), Polish romantic poet
- Harriet Smithson (1808–1854), Anglo-Irish actress, the first wife of Hector Berlioz, and the inspiration for his Symphonie fantastique
- Fernando Sor (1778–1839), guitarist
- Alexandre Soumet (1788–1845), poet
- Stendhal (Marie-Henri Beyle) (1783–1842), writer
- Charles Henri Sanson (1739–1806), executioner of Louis XVI
- Marie Taglioni (1804–1884), ballerina
- Ludmilla Tchérina (1924–2004), dancer, actress and painter
- Ambroise Thomas (1811–1896), opera composer
- Armand Toussaint (1806–1862), sculptor
- Jean-Pierre Travot (1767–1836), general
- Constant Troyon (1810–1865), painter
- François Truffaut (1932–1984), French New Wave filmmaker and director
- Horace Vernet (1789–1863), painter
- Auguste Vestris (1760–1842), dancer
- Gaétan Vestris (1729–1808), dancer
- Pauline Viardot (1821–1910), opera singer, composer
- Alfred de Vigny (1797–1863), poet, playwright, novelist
- Jean-Baptiste Vuillaume (1798–1875), luthier
- René Waldeck-Rousseau (1846–1904), politician
- Walenty Wańkowicz (1799–1842), painter
- Georges-Fernand Widal (1862–1929), bacteriologist
- Émile Zola (1840–1902), author (original site, moved to the Panthéon in 1908). The Zola family grave is still there, with Émile's name on it.

== Gallery ==
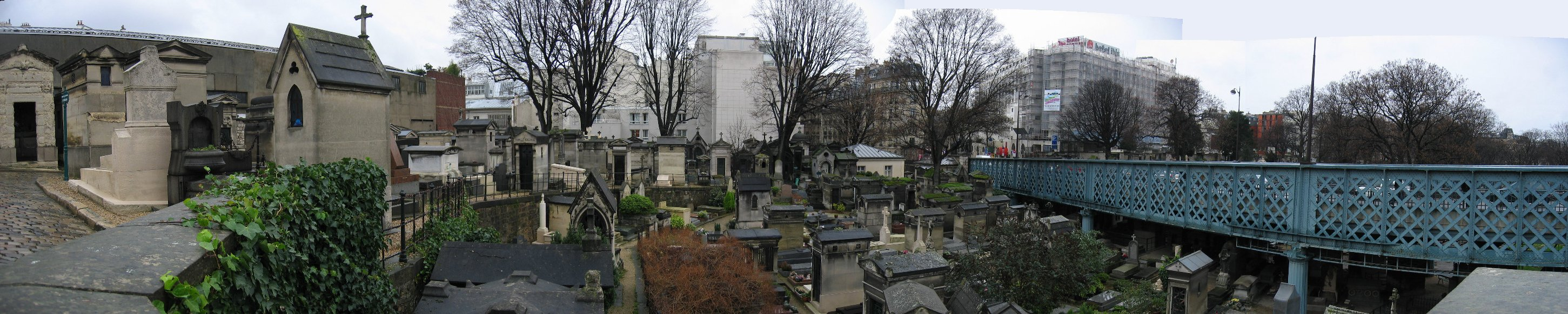
The Montmartre Cemetery with the Rue Caulaincourt viaduct passing through it

== See also ==
- Saint-Vincent Cemetery in Montmartre
- List of burial places of classical musicians
- List of tourist attractions in Paris
