= Louis Antoine Debrauz de Saldapenna =

Austrian secret diplomat and journalist

Chevalier Louis Antoine Debrauz de Saldapenna (2 June 1811 – 18 January 1871) was an Austrian secret diplomat and journalist, founder and editor of the Mémorial diplomatique, a noted statistical expert of his time and the author of numerous books on politics, law and financial subjects.

== Biography ==
=== Early life: from Trieste to Paris ===
Louis Antoine Debrauz de Saldapenna was born 2 June 1811 as Alois Anton Dobrauz (Slovene: Alojz Dobravec) as the son of the trader Luca Dobrauz and his wife Marie in Trieste, in the former empire of Austria-Hungary (now Italy).

After attending grammar school in Ljubljana (German: Laibach) Alois Dobrauz studied law, initially at the Austrian universities of Graz and Vienna.

On 18 November 1833, he enrolled at the University of Pavia for his third year of studies under the name of Luigi Dobrauz. After having been awarded the title of Dr. iur. he entered the civil service at the criminal and civil court in Milan, but he left in 1837 after his first wife Christine Ponthieure de Berlaere had died in childbed giving birth to his twin sons Joseph and Franz Dobrauz. After this he travelled the Italian Peninsula before settling in Paris in 1838 where he married again. His second wife was Denise Eugénie de Sigfeld, the daughter of a high ranking Napoleonic official and officer of the Ordre de la Légion d'Honneur Around that time he translated his name into French. Alois Anton became Louis Antoine and Dobrauz became Debrauz.

=== Journalist and editor in Paris. Part I (1838–1848) ===
From 1838 onwards Louis Debrauz worked as a journalist and co-editor of Émile de Girardin's journal La Presse. In addition he contributed as the Paris correspondent to such renowned newspapers such as the Augsburger Allgemeine Zeitung, the Vienna Lloyd and The Morning Post.

When in 1842, following the unexpected death of the French Crown Prince Ferdinand Philippe, Duke of Orléans the question of a potential regency or Régence became a matter of public interest in France, Louis Debrauz published the book "La Question de la régence, exposée d'après les principes du droit et les usages des États constitutionnels de l'Europe".

In 1843 he supported his personal friend Alphonse de Lamartine by anonymously publishing the book "Guizot et Lamartine".

In the following years Louis Debrauz undertook in-depth studies into ways of reforming the French universities and especially their faculties of law. His findings were published in 1845 in the book L'Enseignement supérieur en harmonie avec les besoins de l'État.

In 1848 he supported the Austrian Empire in its conflict with Italy by publishing favourable articles in the international press. Upon request by Prince Felix of Schwarzenberg a collection of these articles was published in 1849 under the title "La Question Italianne".

=== Civil service and secret diplomacy (1849–1853) ===
In 1848 Alois Debrauz was appointed the director of the Austrian general consulate in Paris, headed by his close friend Baron James Mayer de Rothschild. In this capacity he conducted a reorganisation of the Austrian consulates in France and Spain. In the summer of 1853 he also undertook a journey to Spain, Portugal and Morocco aboard the French steam frigate "Newton" to study their respective economic situations. His findings were subsequently published in the 1854 "Mittheilungen auf dem Gebiete der Statistik".

When in 1853 Emperor Napoleon III of France ascended to the throne, Louis Debrauz published his biography entitled "Napoléon III, empereur des français: esquisse biographique". Through his close friendship with the monarch he had been able to obtain all the relevant information directly from him.

Starting in the autumn of 1852 Debrauz sent secret reports from Paris to Baron Carl Friedrich von Kübeck, the president of the Austrian Reichsrat, who forwarded these directly to Emperor Franz Joseph I of Austria. With directive dated 13 November 1853 the emperor authorized this secret line of reporting Via this channel Debrauz communicated on behalf of Emperor Napoleon III the idea of exchanging Austria's Italian provinces for the so-called Danubian Principalities to Vienna.

However, upon intervention by Count Joseph Alexander Hübner, who saw a dangerous competitor in Debrauz, he was exposed as a double-agent and dismissed from the Austrian civil service in 1855.

=== Journalist and editor in Paris. Part II (1855–1871) ===
Even during his service at the Austrian consulate in Paris, Debrauz had continued to work as a journalist, but after his dismissal he pursued this career with even greater success.

In addition he published a number of hugely successful books such as the 1856 "Le Traité de Paris du 30 mars, étudié dans ces causes et dans ces effetes", which shed light on a number of diplomatic secrets. In 1859 followed "La paix de Villafranca et les conférences de Zurich", in 1861 "Le rachat de la Vénétie est-il une solution?" and in 1862 both "Solution de la crise hongroise" and "La Situation financière de l'Autriche et le plan financier de M. de Plener.". In 1863 Debrauz published "Organisation administrative des États de l'Église. Mémoire du gouvernement pontifical communiqué par le nonce du Saint-Siège au Cabinet français le 12 janvier 1863".

In 1859 Louis Debrauz founded the Paris weekly journal Mémorial diplomatique dedicated to matters of international politics, which he directed until the end of his life and to which he also contributed hundreds of articles.

=== Secretary of the International Statistical Congresses ===
In 1855, 1857 and 1860 Louis Debrauz participated in the International Statistical Congresses in Paris, Vienna and London, where he also acted as the Congress' secretary.

=== Knighthood (1858) ===
On 17 February 1858 Dr. Alois Dobrauz was awarded the Austrian Order of the Iron Crown by Emperor Franz Joseph I and subsequently ennobled with the hereditary title Ritter di Saldapenna. Styled "Alois Dobrauz Ritter di Saldapenna", for the rest of his life, which was spent in Paris, he however mainly used the French version "Chevalier Louis Antoine Debrauz de Saldapenna". His offspring who remained in Austria continued to use the German form Dobrauz, after 1867 usually without the predicate di Saldapenna.

=== Debrauz and the lawsuit following the expedition of Counts Castellani and Freschi (1859) ===
In 1859 Louis Antoine Debrauz de Saldapenna orchestrated in Paris, as the personal representative of the Austrian Archduke Ferdinand Maximilan, the Lombardo-Venetian Count Castellani's proceedings against Egypt, which were also supported by Édouard Drouyn de Lhuys As a result, Castellani succeeded in extracting the then enormous sum of 700,000 francs as compensation for damages allegedly caused by overexposing valuable Chinese silk worms to the sun during transport between Suez and Cairo.

=== Secret agent in the case of the Mexican crown (1863) ===
At the beginning of the 1860s Emperor Napoleon III of France wished to establish a monarchy, strongly linked to France, in Mexico. To do so he wished to place the descendant of a leading European ruling house on this new throne. His candidate of choice was the Austrian Archduke Ferdinand Maximilan, the hugely popular younger brother of Emperor Franz Joseph I. To communicate this, and to convince the archduke, Napoleon III sent Debrauz de Saldapenna, who not only originally came from Trieste himself, but also was a close personal friend of the archduke, to his castle of Miramare.

When the Mexican delegation officially offered the Mexican crown to Maximilian, Louis Debrauz de Saldapenna accompanied them, and exclusively reported about this in the Mémorial diplomatique.

After Maximilian was crowned emperor of Mexico in 1864 the Mémorial diplomatique served as one of his main channels of communication in Europe. Even after Maximilian's tragic death in 1867 Debrauz de Saldapenna kept defending him and his cause. However, in Austria, Louis Debrauz de Saldapenna was perceived as one of those chiefly responsible for Maximilian's death and became persona non-grata.

=== The King of Prussia's lawsuit against the Mémorial diplomatique (1866–1867) ===
During the 1866 war between Austria and Prussia Debrauz de Saldapenna published in close collaboration with the then Austrian ambassador in Paris, Prince Richard von Metternich, a series of critical articles directed against Prussia. After it was claimed in one of them that, during the battles in Bohemia, the King of Prussia had personally seized valuables from the property of Count Mensdorff-Pouilly as well as from Prince Lobkowitz, the Prussian ambassador in Paris, Count Robert von der Goltz, sued the Mémorial diplomatique for causing offence against a foreign sovereign via the press. In this trial, which attracted much public interest, the interests of the Mémorial diplomatique were represented by the later French prime minister Jules Armand Dufaure.

=== The Mémorial diplomatique and the Lettres espagnoles (1867) ===
In 1867 Louis Antoine Debrauz de Saldapenna created quite a stir when he in collaboration with Juan de Grimaldi and Ramón María Narváez y Campos, 1st Duke of Valencia published in the 'Mémorial diplomatique' a series of articles titled Lettres espagnoles. In these articles they successfully undertook to prove wrong the French historian François Guizot and his presentation of Spain as well as of Narváez .

In 1864 Louis Antoine Debrauz de Saldapenna was made an Officier de l'Ordre de la Légion d'Honneur and a Commander of the Mexican Order of Guadalupe. He died on 18 January 1871 at the age of 59 during the siege of Paris; his tomb is at Montmartre Cemetery.

== Family ==
Debrauz de Saldapenna's descendants included, among others, Johann von Dobrauz, who in 1878 received the highest commendation as an officer of the Austrian-Hungarian imperial army, Austrian public law expert Dr. Karl Dobrauz, and composer and arranger Prof. Carl Dobrauz.

To celebrate the 200th anniversary of Louis Antoine Debrauz de Saldapenna's birthday, Dr. Guenther Dobrauz, a direct descendant, published a comprehensive biography titled "agent obscur".

== Works ==
- La Question de la Régence, exposée d'après les principes du droit et les usages des États constitutionnels de l'Europe. B. Dussillion et compagnie, Paris 1842.
- Guizot et Lamartine, ou la politique du cabinet du 29 Oct, jugée par un observateur impartial. B. Dussillion, Paris 1842.
- L'Enseignement supérieur en harmonie avec les besoins de l'État, projet de réorganisation des Facultés de droit en France, précédé d'une Lettre approbative de M. le ministre de l'instruction publique. B. Dussillion, Paris 1845.
- La Question Italianne. Examinée sous le point de vue. Des intérêts de l'Europe en général, et de la France en particulier; par un observateur impartial. Plon Frères, Paris 1849.Google book
- Napoléon III, empereur des français: esquisse biographique. Plon frères, Paris 1853.
- Darstellung der gewerblichen und commerciellen Zustände Spaniens mit besonderer Rücksicht auf den Verkehr dieses Landes mit Oesterreich. in: Direction der administrativen Statistik im k.k. Handels-Ministerium (Ed.) Mittheilungen aus dem Gebiete der Statistik. III. Jahrgang, 3. Heft, k.k. Hof u. Staatsdruckerei, Vienna 1854.
- Darstellung der nationalökonomischen Zustände Portugals mit besonderer Rücksicht auf d. Verkehr mit Oesterreich. in: Direction der administrativen Statistik im k.k. Handels-Ministerium (Ed.) Mittheilungen aus dem Gebiete der Statistik. III. Jahrgang, 5. Heft; k.k. Hof u. Staatsdruckerei, Vienna 1854.Google book
- Darstellung der nationalökonomischen Zustände Marokko's mit besonderer Rücksicht auf d. Verkehr mit Oesterreich. in: Direction der administrativen Statistik im k.k. Handels-Ministerium (Ed.) Mittheilungen aus dem Gebiete der Statistik, III. Jahrgang, 6. Heft; k.k. Hof u. Staatsdruckerei, Vienna 1854.Google book
- Le Traité de Paris du 30 mars, étudié dans ces causes et dans ces effetes. Amyont, Paris 1856.
- La paix de Villafranca et les conférences de Zurich. Amyont, Paris 1859.Google book
- Le rachat de la Vénétie est-il une solution? Amyot, Paris 1861.Google book
- La Situation financière de l'Autriche et le plan financier de M. de Plener. Amyot, Paris 1862.
- Solution de la crise hongroise. Amyot, Paris 1862.Google book
- Organisation administrative des états de l'église. Amyot, Paris 1863.Google book

== Literature ==
- Egon Caesar Conte Corti: Maximilian und Charlotte von Mexiko. 2 Vol., Amaltheaverlag, Vienna 1924.
- Friedrich Engel-Jánosi: Der Freiherr von Hübner, 1811–1892: Eine Gestalt aus dem Österreich Kaiser Franz Josephs. Universitäts-Verlag Wagner, Innsbruck 1933.
- Karl Friedrich Frank-Döfering: Adelslexikon des Österreichischen Kaisertums 1804–1918. Vol. 2 (1823–1918), Vienna 1928.
- David Thatcher Gies: Theatre and Politics in Nineteenth-Century Spain: Juan de Grimaldi as Impresario and Government Agent. Cambridge University Press, Cambridge 1988, ISBN 0-521-34293-7, ISBN 978-0-521-34293-3.
- David S. Landes: Bankers and Pashas: International Finance and Economic Imperialism in Egypt. Harvard University Press, Cambridge (MA) 1958, ISBN 0-674-06165-9.
- Paul Müller: Feldmarschall Fürst Windischgrätz. Revolution und Gegenrevolution in Österreich. Wilhelm Braumüller Universitäts-Verlagsbuchhandlung, Vienna 1934.
- Martin Senner: Die Donaufürstentümer als Tauschobjekt für die österreichischen Besitzungen in Italien(1853–1866). F. Steiner Verlag, Wiesbaden 1988, ISBN 3-515-04906-1, ISBN 978-3-515-04906-1.
- Constant von Wurzbach: Biographisches Lexikon des Kaiserthums Oesterreich. Vol. 3, Vienna 1858.
- Claudio Zanier: Alla ricerca del seme perduto: sulla via della seta tra scienza e speculazione (1858–1862). FrancoAngeli, Milano 1993, ISBN 88-204-7864-1, ISBN 978-88-204-7864-3.
