= Murder of Chloé Ansel =

Crime case in France

Chloé Ansel
- Ansell, c. 2015
- Born: 4 April 2006; Calais, France
- Died: 15 April 2015 (aged 9); Calais, France
- Cause of death: Strangulation
- Resting place: Cimetiere Nord, Bethune, Calais, France; 48.8878°N 2.3302°E (approximate)
- Known for: Murder victim

On 15 April 2015, 9-year-old Chloé Ansel, of Calais, France, was abducted near her home, sexually assaulted, and strangled to death. Hours later, her body was discovered near the woods in Calais. The suspect, Polish national Zbigniew Huminski, was quickly arrested and confessed to the crime. On 21 April, after a funeral at St. Pierre Church in Calais, Ansel was buried at Montmartre Cemetery.

On 15 May 2017, the alleged murderer hanged himself in his cell at the Sequedin prison in Nord.

== Chronology of events ==
=== Disappearance ===
On 15 April 2015, at 15:30, 9-year-old Chloé Ansel, from the quarter of Petit-Courgain, disappeared in Calais, a kidnapping victim last seen entering a suspicious red Seat Toledo, then believed to be with Belgian registration. Ansel, born on 4 April 2006, was enrolled in CE2 at Chateaubriand primary school and was the oldest of three children, having a younger sister and a brother. She was described by her father, David Ansel, as a "cheerful little girl", "very courageous", who worked well at school and was very polite. Her mother, Isabelle Hyart, said that she was an "adorable little girl, always smiling" and that she "loved life".

Chloé, who had previously attended the birthday of one of her friends, was about to go to her dance classes at 4 o'clock, and was playing with a water pistol with one of her friends. Her mother, wanting to change her two children, and to look for Chloé's sporting goods, left her alone for a few minutes, after first monitoring her from the window of her home. As for the suspect, he had "been around for three days", and was near the trash cans drinking beer.

After Ansel splashed Huminski with her water gun, the latter grabbed her by the hand and pushed her into his vehicle, after threatening Chloé with death, saying, "I will kill you," and striking her head against a wall. A bystander attempted to save her, but the suspect pushed him away and threatened to "shoot his face", after telling him to get away. Ansel's mother witnessed the abduction, after seeing her daughter lying on the ground.

=== Investigation and discovery of the body ===
After the abduction, Chloé's ballet flats were found near the scene of her disappearance.

A call for witnesses was launched via Facebook, while some residents pointed out the false leads and slow reaction of the police. As the parents were divorced, David had to go to the police station to agree to trigger the kidnapping alert, but it was already too late. Her naked body was found about an hour and a half later, about 17:15, in a forest. Chloé's body bore signs of sexual assault and strangulation, which were corroborated by the autopsy performed two days later.

=== Arrest of suspect and confession ===
A suspect of Polish nationality, Zbigniew Huminski, was placed in police custody while he was intoxicated. He later admitted to having abducted and then raped Chloé Ansel. The following day, Huminski was indicted for abduction, rape, forcible confinement and murder.

=== Suicide of the accused ===
On 15 May 2017, the alleged murderer hanged himself in his cell in Sequedin Prison, in Nord. His trial at the cour d'assises was scheduled for September of that year. With his death, the investigation into the case officially closed.

== Biography of Zbigniew Huminski ==
Born in 1977, the 38-year-old Polish worker was already known to the police.

After a difficult childhood which saw the divorce of his parents, Zbigniew Huminski dropped off the education system. He then committed numerous thefts in Poland, including one in 2000 in Warsaw, justifying it with his harsh economic situation. In 2015, he supposedly served a year in prison. In the early 2000s, he left for France. In 2004, he was sentenced for armed robbery and illegal occupation of a home, and then, upon his return to Poland, was sent to prison. Because of his criminal past, he was rejected from joining the Foreign Legion.

In 2009, he threatened a 9-year-old girl, whose father described the suspect as "someone bad, a predator" who "observes and then [he] acts". The girl later had to be treated for psychological trauma.

On 30 March 2010, he was sentenced to six years' imprisonment and banned from entering French territory for violent extortion, aggravated theft, and forcible confinement or attempted forcible confinement, following several attacks, including one with a knife against an elderly woman. During his trial, he was described as "intolerant of frustration, immature and lacking self-esteem". However, he remained in France at the end of his detention, ultimately shortened to two years, and then settled in Calais, where he lived for the next 15 years. In this regard, the victim's mother said that she did not understand why he was in France, but the Boulogne prosecutor, Jean-Pierre Valensi, clarified that the territory ban could not be applied to the suspect with regard to the offenses for which he had been convicted there.

== Tributes and political reactions ==
On 16 April 2015, a white march, which brought 5,000 people, was organized in Chloé's memory; a second white march took place on 18 April, which brought 2,500 people, including Miss France 2015, Camille Cerf. A balloon release took place on 25 April.

On 22 April, during Ansel's funeral, the mayor of Calais, Natacha Bouchard, declared that she wanted to transform the garden square in which the tragedy took place into a "place of rest", in order to pay homage to Chloé Ansel.

The Prime Minister of France, Manuel Valls, said on 16 April 2015, that "the whole truth will be made to understand the life of the Polish suspect". The following day, the secretary-general of the UMP Laurent Wauquiez said that the tragedy "confirms that the crimina policy of disarmament of Mme. Taubira (then Minister of Justice) is madness" and called for "the General Inspectorate of Judicial Services be seized". Valérie Pécresse said that it was necessary to review the Schengen Agreement. Polish police declared to have no responsibility for Huminski's crimes.

== See also ==
- List of kidnappings
- List of unsolved murders (2000–present)

== TV documentaries ==
- "The murder of little Chloé" (first report) in "These cases marked 2015" (28 December 2015; 4/12 January/29, 2016) in Crimes on NRJ 12.
