= François Fertiault =

French writer

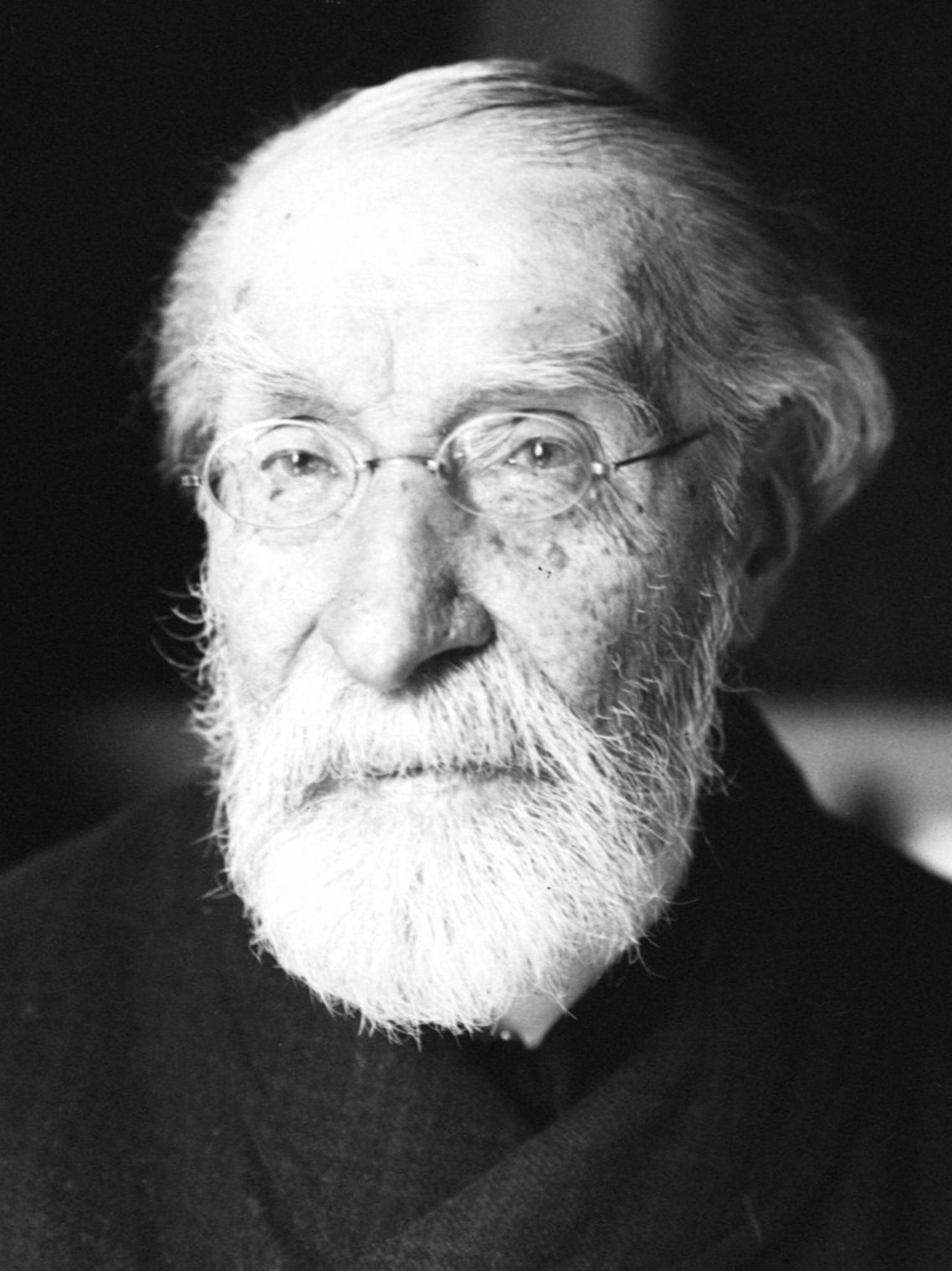
- François Fertiault at the age of 100, in 1914.
- Born: François Fertiault; 25 May 1814; Verdun-sur-le-Doubs, Saône-et-Loire, France
- Died: 5 October 1915 (aged 101); France
- Occupations: novelist, poet, essayist, and children's literaturist
- Spouse: Julie Rodde

François Fertiault (25 June 1814 – 5 October 1915) was a French novelist, poet, essayist, and writer of children's literature.

== Early life ==
Fertiault was born in Verdun-sur-le-Doubs, in département Saône-et-Loire, located in central eastern France. His father was a soldier who combatted under Napoléon and died during the German Campaign of 1813. Thanks to the help provided by his uncle and a clerk, François Fertiault attended a school in Chalon-sur-Saône since 1820, where he graduated Baccalauréat at the age of 20.

== Early career ==
During his school years, Fertiault's literary drafts proved to be promising; Fertiault was immediately hired within the editorial board of the newspaper Patriote de Saône-et-Loire and starts working as a literary critic. Then, he settled in Paris, where he worked in the printing house Donbey-Dupré from 8 August 1835. In 1836, he is hired as a secretary in a bank in Bischoffsheim, in département Bas-Rhin, in north-eastern France. He worked there until the French Revolution of 1848.

== Publishing ==
François Fertiault after married Julie Rodde, supported his wife in his literary works, and published several books with her.

Fertiault and his wife settled in Paris a few years later. There, they work as publishers of the periodical Feuilleton de Paris, and then of the Bulletin de Paris between 1858 and 1864. Besides his author career, Fertiault was also a literary critic until the end of his life, mainly dealing with modern and contemporary literature. Thanks to Alphonse Lemerre, Fertiault joined the Parnassianism move and collaborated to the redaction of the famous anthology Le Parnasse contemporain. Fertiault also corresponded with the Norman poet Alexandre Piédagnel.

== Personal life ==
Fertiault's wife, Julie, was the daughter of journalist Victor Rodde (1792–1835), he had married her in 1841, and she died in 1900. Their only child died during early childhood. Fertiault retired progressively from his literary career and died in Paris at the age of 101 on 5 October 1915.

== Works ==
Novels and tales

- Arthur ou le dîner de sept châtelains, 1837
- Au clair pays, 1897
- Le dix-neuvième siècle. Satires, 1840 (with Eugène Nus)
- Les imperceptibles, 1903
- Les voix amies, 1864 (with Julie Rodde)

Poems

- Intimes et familières, 1907
- Le poème des larmes 1858 (with his wife Julie Rodde)
- Rimes bourguignones, 1899
- Sympathies, 1898

Children and youth books

- La bonne étoile, 1845
- En Bourgogne, 1898
- La chambre aux histoires, 1874
- Pâquerettes et boutons d'or, 1844
- Le petits drames rustiques, 1875

Essays

- Les amoureux du livre, Claudin, Paris, 1877.
- Dictionnaire du langage populaire Verduno-Chalonnais, Bouillon, Paris, 1898.
- Les drames et cancans du livre, Lemerre, Paris, 1900.
- Les légendes du livre, Claudin, Paris, 1886.
- Les mystères du destin, Lemerre, Paris, 1888 (published under the anagram « Cranisof Altifuret »).
- La vie du livre, Lemerre, Paris, 1909.

== Legacy ==
In Verdun-sur-le-Doubs, Fertiault's natal village, a street is named "François Fertiault".
