= Yvette Alde =

French painter, lithographer and illustrator

- Born: June 28, 1911; Paris, France
- Died: October 30, 1967 (aged 56); Paris
- Movement: figurative art, École de Paris

Yvette Alde (June 28, 1911 – October 30, 1967) was a French painter, lithographer, and Illustrator. She belongs to the School of Paris.

== Biography ==
Alde studied at the Académie de la Grande Chaumière, where her teachers were fr:Charles Picart Le Doux and André Lhote. She debuted in the Paris Salon in 1933. Her first solo exhibition was in December 1935 in Barcelona. In August 1946, she married Max Cogniat.

Alde lived in the cité Montmartre-aux-artistes building in Montmartre. She died in October 1967, and is buried in the 30th division of the Montmartre Cemetery.

== Collections ==
- Centre national des arts plastiques
- Musée Carnavalet, Paris, Kermesse aux étoiles dans le jardin des Tuileries, 1955
- Musée d'art et d'histoire de Cognac, Le jugement de Pâris
- Musée Hébert
- Museum of Art in Łódź
- Musée d'art moderne de la ville de Paris
- Princeton University Art Museum
- Tel Aviv Museum of Art
