= Aunay-sous-Auneau =

- Commune
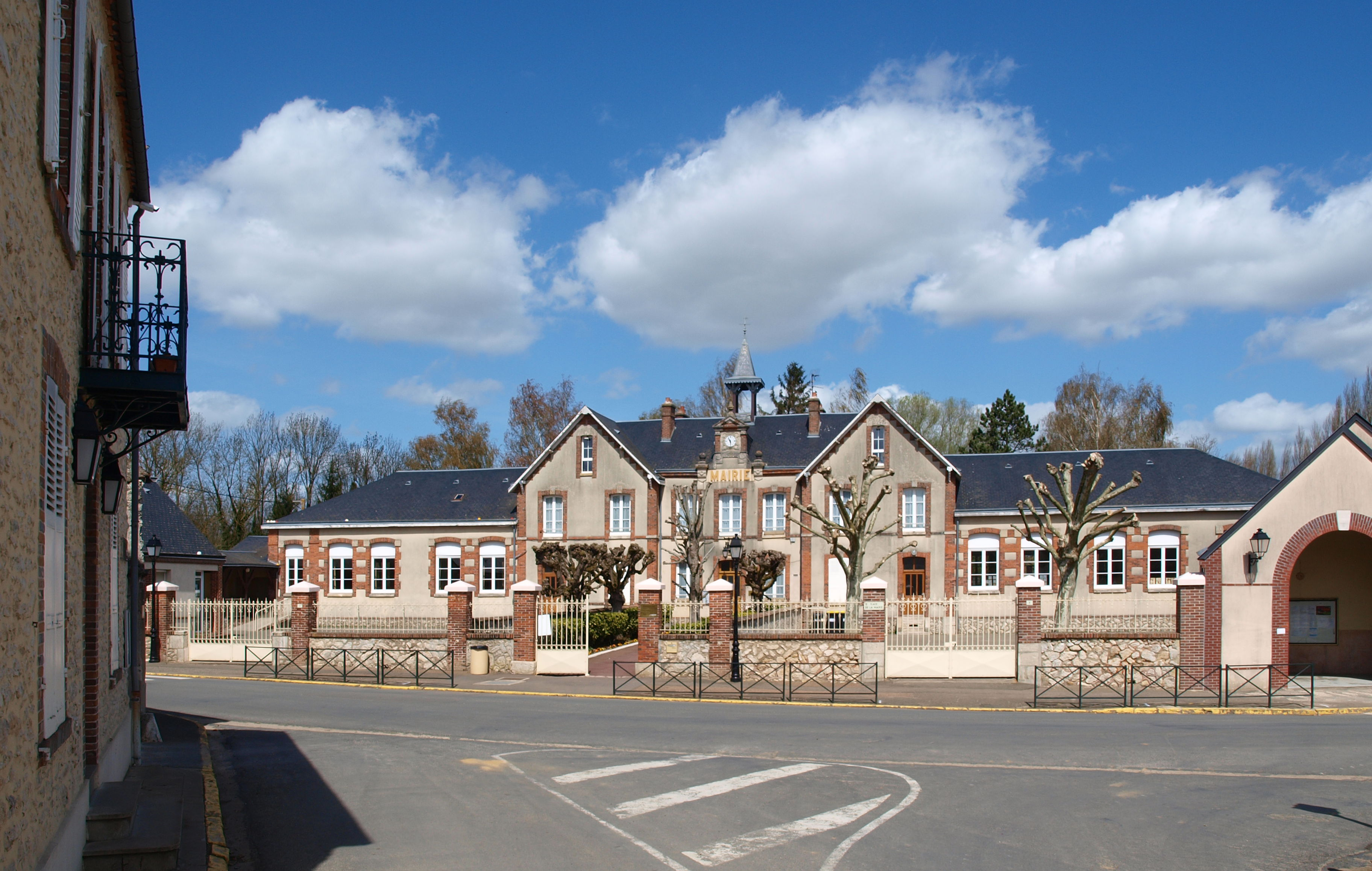
- Town hall and school

- Coat of arms
- Location of Aunay-sous-Auneau
- Location within France Location within Centre-Val de Loire
- Coordinates: 48°26′31″N 1°48′32″E
- Country: France
- Region: Centre-Val de Loire
- Department: Eure-et-Loir
- Arrondissement: Chartres
- Canton: Auneau
- Intercommunality: CC Portes Euréliennes Île-de-France

Government
  - Mayor (2020–2026): Robert Darien
- Area^{1}: 19.41 km^{2} (7.49 sq mi)
- Elevation: 118 m (387 ft)
- Highest elevation: 161 m (528 ft)
- Lowest elevation: 127 m (417 ft)
- Population (2023): 1,484
  - Density: 76.46/km^{2} (198.0/sq mi)
- Time zone: UTC+01:00 (CET)
  - Summer (DST): UTC+02:00 (CEST)
- INSEE/Postal code: 28013 /28700
- ^{1} French Land Register data, which excludes lakes, ponds, glaciers > 1 km^{2} (0.386 sq mi or 247 acres) and river estuaries.

Aunay-sous-Auneau (French pronunciation: [onɛ su.z‿ono], literally Aunay under Auneau) is a commune in the Eure-et-Loir department in northern France.

== Population ==
Historical population
Year	Pop.	±% p.a.
1968	755	—
1975	881	+2.23%
1982	1,109	+3.34%
1990	1,239	+1.40%
1999	1,328	+0.77%
2007	1,395	+0.62%
2012	1,409	+0.20%
2017	1,483	+1.03%
2023	1,484	+0.01%
Source: INSEE

== See also ==
- Communes of the Eure-et-Loir department
