= Live-cell imaging =

Study of living cells using time-lapse microscopy

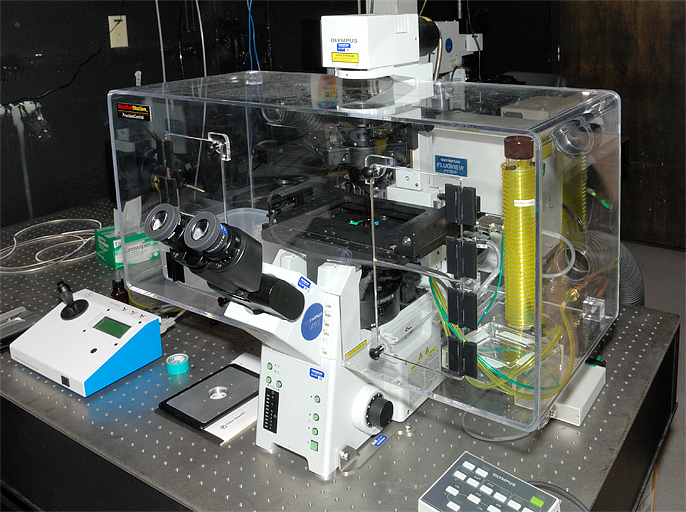
A live-cell microscope. Live-cell microscopes are generally inverted. To keep cells alive during observation, the microscopes are commonly enclosed in a micro cell incubator (the transparent box).

Live-cell imaging is the study of living cells using time-lapse microscopy. It is used by scientists to obtain a better understanding of biological function through the study of cellular dynamics. Live-cell imaging was pioneered in the first decade of the 21st century. One of the first time-lapse microcinematographic films of cells ever made was made by Julius Ries, showing the fertilization and development of the sea urchin egg. Since then, several microscopy methods have been developed to study living cells in greater detail with less effort. A newer type of imaging using quantum dots have been used, as they are shown to be more stable. The development of holotomographic microscopy has disregarded phototoxicity and other staining-derived disadvantages by implementing digital staining based on cells’ refractive index.

== Overview ==
Biological systems exist as a complex interplay of countless cellular components interacting across four dimensions to produce the phenomenon called life. While it is common to reduce living organisms to non-living samples to accommodate traditional static imaging tools, the further the sample deviates from the native conditions, the more likely the delicate processes in question will exhibit perturbations. The onerous task of capturing the true physiological identity of living tissue, therefore, requires high-resolution visualization across both space and time within the parent organism. The technological advances of live-cell imaging, designed to provide spatiotemporal images of subcellular events in real time, serves an important role for corroborating the biological relevance of physiological changes observed during experimentation. Due to their contiguous relationship with physiological conditions, live-cell assays are considered the standard for probing complex and dynamic cellular events. As dynamic processes such as migration, cell development, and intracellular trafficking increasingly become the focus of biological research, techniques capable of capturing 3-dimensional data in real time for cellular networks (in situ) and entire organisms (in vivo) will become indispensable tools in understanding biological systems. The general acceptance of live-cell imaging has led to a rapid expansion in the number of practitioners and established a need for increased spatial and temporal resolution without compromising the health of the cell.

== Types of microscopy used ==
=== Phase contrast ===
Phase contrast microscopy time-lapse video of dividing rattle grasshopper spermatocytes. This historic film, which popularized phase contrast microscopy, was made in the early 1940s by Kurt Michel of the Carl Zeiss company.

Before the introduction of the phase-contrast microscope, it was difficult to observe living cells. As living cells are translucent, they must be stained to be visible in a traditional light microscope. Unfortunately, the process of staining cells generally kills them. With the invention of the phase-contrast microscopy it became possible to observe unstained living cells in detail. After its introduction in the 1940s, live-cell imaging rapidly became popular using phase-contrast microscopy. The phase-contrast microscope was popularized through a series of time-lapse movies (see video), recorded using a photographic film camera. Its inventor, Frits Zernike, was awarded the Nobel Prize in 1953. Other later phase-contrast techniques used to observe unstained cells are Hoffman modulation and differential interference contrast microscopy.

=== Fluorescent ===
Fluorescent microscopy time-lapse video of a dividing purple sea urchin embryo.

Phase-contrast microscopy does not have the capacity to observe specific proteins or other organic chemical compounds which form the complex machinery of a cell. Synthetic and organic fluorescent stains have therefore been developed to label such compounds, making them observable by fluorescent microscopy (see video). Fluorescent stains are, however, phototoxic, invasive and bleach when observed. This limits their use when observing living cells over extended periods of time. Non-invasive phase-contrast techniques are therefore often used as a vital complement to fluorescent microscopy in live-cell imaging applications. Deep learning-assisted fluorescence microscopy methods, however, help to reduced light burden and phototoxicity and allow even repeated high resolution live imaging.

=== Quantitative phase contrast ===
Quantitative phase contrast microscopy video of a dividing breast cancer cells.

As a result of the rapid increase in pixel density of digital image sensors, quantitative phase-contrast microscopy has emerged as an alternative microscopy method for live-cell imaging. Quantitative phase-contrast microscopy has an advantage over fluorescent and phase-contrast microscopy in that it is both non-invasive and quantitative in its nature.

Due to the narrow focal depth of conventional microscopy, live-cell imaging is to a large extent currently limited to observing cells on a single plane. Most implementations of quantitative phase-contrast microscopy allow creating and focusing images at different focal planes from a single exposure. This opens up the future possibility of 3-dimensional live-cell imaging by means of fluorescence techniques. Quantitative phase-contrast microscopy with rotational scanning allow 3D time-lapse images of living cells to be acquired at high resolution.

=== Holotomography ===
Holotomography (HT) is a laser technique to measure three-dimensional refractive index (RI) tomogram of a microscopic sample such as biological cells and tissues. Because the RI can serve as an intrinsic imaging contrast for transparent or phase objects, measurements of RI tomograms can provide label-free quantitative imaging of microscopic phase objects. In order to measure 3D RI tomogram of samples, HT employs the principle of holographic imaging and inverse scattering. Typically, multiple 2D holographic images of a sample are measured at various illumination angles, employing the principle of interferometric imaging. Then, a 3D RI tomogram of the sample is reconstructed from these multiple 2D holographic images by inversely solving light scattering in the sample.

The principle of HT is very similar to X-ray computed tomography (CT), or CT scan. CT scan measures multiple 2D X-ray images of a human body at various illumination angles, and a 3D tomogram (X-ray absorptivity) is then retrieved using the inverse scattering theory. Both the X-ray CT and laser HT shares the same governing equation – Helmholtz equation, the wave equation for a monochromatic wavelength. HT is also known as optical diffraction tomography.

The combination of holography and rotational scanning allows long-term, label-free, live-cell recordings.

Non-invasive optical nanoscopy can achieve such a lateral resolution by using a quasi-2π-holographic detection scheme and complex deconvolution. The spatial frequencies of the imaged cell do not make any sense to the human eye. But these scattered frequencies are converted into a hologram and synthesize a bandpass, which has a resolution double the one normally available. Holograms are recorded from different illumination directions on the sample plane and observe sub-wavelength tomographic variations of the specimen. Nanoscale apertures serve to calibrate the tomographic reconstruction and to characterize the imaging system by means of the coherent transfer function. This gives rise to realistic inverse filtering and guarantees true complex field reconstruction.

In conclusion, the 2 terminologies of (i) optical resolution (the real one) and (ii) sampling resolution (the one on the screen) are separated for 3D holotomographic microscopy.

== Instrumentation and optics ==
Live-cell imaging represents a careful compromise between acquiring the highest-resolution image and keeping the cells alive for as long as possible. As a result, live-cell microscopists face a unique set of challenges that are often overlooked when working with fixed specimens. Moreover, live-cell imaging often employs special optical system and detector specifications. For example, ideally the microscopes used in live-cell imaging would have high signal-to-noise ratios, fast image acquisition rates to capture time-lapse video of extracellular events, and maintaining the long-term viability of the cells. However, optimizing even a single facet of image acquisition can be resource-intensive and should be considered on a case-by-case basis.

=== Lens designs ===
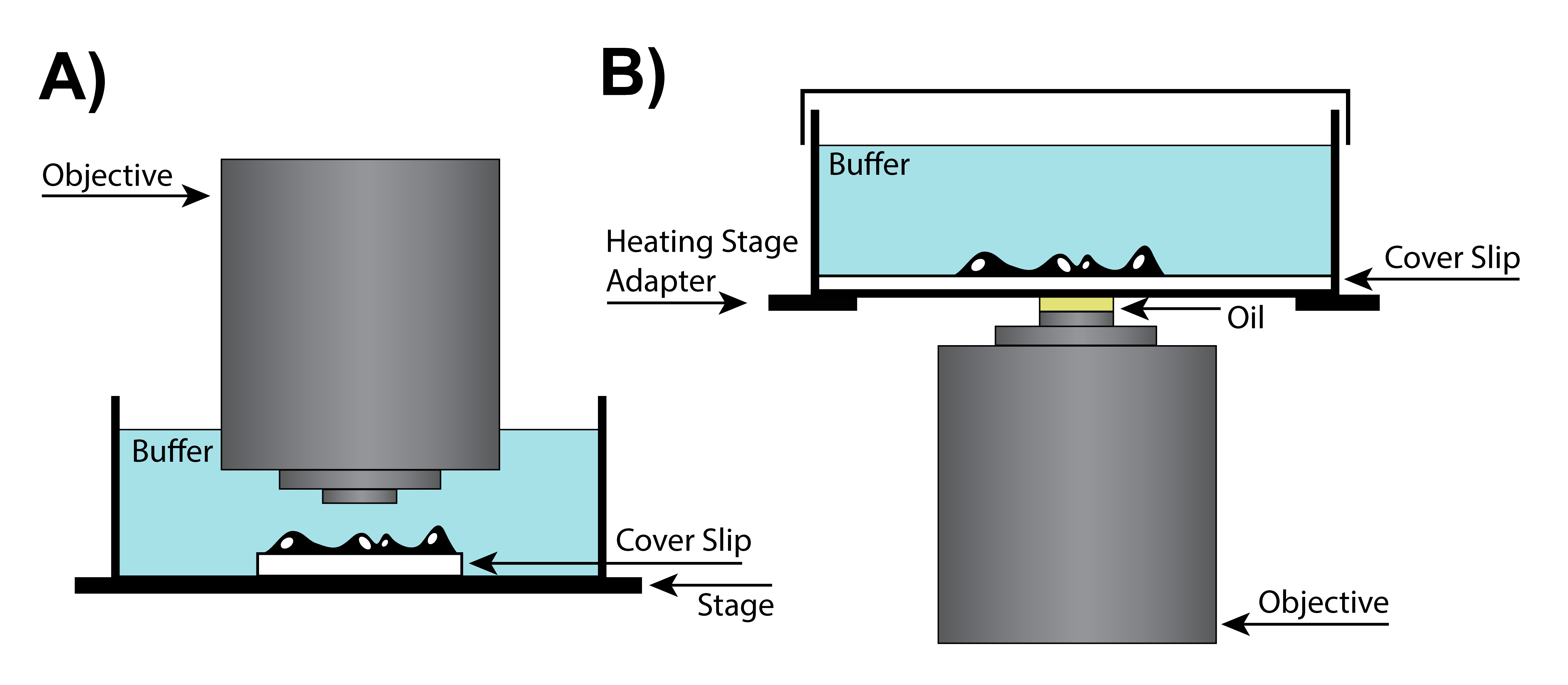
A) Upright lens configuration. B) Inverted lens configuration.

==== Low-magnification "dry" ====
In cases where extra space between the objective and the specimen is required to work with the sample, a dry lens can be used, potentially requiring additional adjustments of the correction collar, which changes the location of the lens in the objective, to account for differences in imaging chambers. Special objective lenses are designed with correction collars that correct for spherical aberrations while accounting for the cover-slip thickness. In high-numerical-aperture (NA) dry objective lenses, the correction collar adjustment ring changes the position of a movable lens group to account for differences in the way the outside of the lens focuses light relative to the center. Although lens aberrations are inherent in all lens designs, they become more problematic in dry lenses, where resolution retention is key.

==== Oil-immersion high-NA ====
Oil immersion is a technique that can increase image resolution by immersing the lens and the specimen in oil with a high refractive index. Since light bends when it passes between media with different refractive indexes, by placing oil with the same refractive index as glass between the lens and the slide, two transitions between refractive indices can be avoided. However, for most applications it is recommended that oil immersion be used with fixed (dead) specimens because live cells require an aqueous environment, and the mixing of oil and water can cause severe spherical aberrations. For some applications silicone oil can be used to produce more accurate image reconstructions. Silicone oil is an attractive medium because it has a refractive index that is close to that of living cells, allowing to produce high-resolution images while minimizing spherical aberrations.

==== Water-immersion ====
Live-cell imaging requires a sample in an aqueous environment that is often 50 to 200 micrometers away from the cover glass. Therefore, water-immersion lenses can help achieve a higher resolving power due to the fact that both the environment and the cells themselves will be close to the refractive index of water. Water-immersion lenses are designed to be compatible with the refractive index of water and usually have a corrective collar that allows adjustment of the objective. Additionally, because of the higher refractive index of water, water-immersion lenses have a high numerical aperture and can produce images superior to oil-immersion lens when resolving planes deeper than 0 μm.

==== Dipping ====
Another solution for live-cell imaging is the dipping lens. These lenses are a subset of water-immersion lenses that do not require a cover slip and can be dipped directly into the aqueous environment of the sample. One of the main advantages of the dipping lens is that it has a long effective working distance. Since a cover slip is not required, this type of lens can approach the surface of the specimen, and as a result, the resolution is limited by the restraints imposed by spherical aberration rather than the physical limitations of the cover slip. Although dipping lenses can be very useful, they are not ideal for all experiments, since the act of "dipping" the lens can disturb the cells in the sample. Additionally, since the incubation chamber must be open to the lens, changes in the sample environment due to evaporation must be closely monitored.

== Phototoxicity and photobleaching ==
Today, most live imaging techniques rely on either high-illumination regimes or fluorescent labelling, both inducing phototoxicity and compromising the ability to keep cells unperturbed and alive over time. Since our knowledge of biology is driven by observation, it is key to minimize the perturbations induced by the imaging technique.

The rise of confocal microscopy is closely correlated with accessibility of high-power lasers, which are able to achieve high intensities of light excitation. However, the high-power output can damage sensitive fluorophores, so the lasers usually run significantly below their full power output. Overexposure to light can result in photodamage due to photobleaching or phototoxicity. The effects of photobleaching can significantly reduce the quality of fluorescent images, and in recent years there has been a significant demand for longer-lasting commercial fluorophores. One solution, the Alexa Fluor series, show little to no fading even at high laser intensities.

Under physiological conditions, many cells and tissue types are exposed to only low levels of light. As a result, it is important to minimize the exposure of live cells to high doses of ultraviolet (UV), infrared (IR), or fluorescence exciting wavelengths of light, which can damage DNA, raise cellular temperatures, and cause photobleaching respectively. High-energy photons absorbed by the fluorophores and the sample are emitted at longer wavelengths proportional to the Stokes shift. However, cellular organelles can be damaged when the photon energy produces chemical and molecular changes rather than being re-emitted. It is believed that the primary culprit in the light-induced toxicity experienced by live cells is a result of free radicals produced by the excitation of fluorescent molecules. These free radicals are highly reactive and cause the destruction of cellular components, which can result in non-physiological behavior.

One method of minimizing photo-damage is to lower the oxygen concentration in the sample to avoid the formation of reactive oxygen species. However, this method is not always possible in live-cell imaging and may require additional intervention. Another method for reducing the effects of free radicals in the sample is the use of antifade reagents. Unfortunately, most commercial antifade reagents cannot be used in live-cell imaging because of their toxicity. Instead, natural free-radical scavengers such as vitamin C or vitamin E can be used without substantially altering physiological behavior on shorter time scales. Phototoxicity-free live-cell imaging has recently been developed and commercialised. Holotomographic microscopy avoids phototoxicity thanks to its low-power laser (laser class 1: 0.2 mW/mm^{2}).

== See also ==
- Cytometry
- Quantitative phase imaging
- Time-lapse microscopy
- Live single-cell imaging
