= Live single-cell imaging =

In systems biology, live single-cell imaging is a live-cell imaging technique that combines traditional live-cell imaging and time-lapse microscopy techniques with automated cell tracking and feature extraction, drawing many techniques from high-content screening. It is used to study signalling dynamics and behaviour in populations of individual living cells. Live single-cell studies can reveal key behaviours that would otherwise be masked in population averaging experiments such as western blots.

In a live single-cell imaging experiment a fluorescent reporter is introduced into a cell line to measure the levels, localisation or activity of a signalling molecule. Subsequently, a population of cells is imaged over time with careful atmospheric control to maintain viability, and reduce stress upon the cells. Automated cell tracking is then performed upon these time series images, following which filtering and quality control may be performed. Analysis of features describing the fluorescent reporter over time, can then lead to modelling and generation of biological conclusions from which further experimentation can be guided.

== History ==
The field of live single-cell imaging began with work demonstrating that green fluorescent protein (GFP), found in the jellyfish Aequorea victoria, could be expressed in living organisms. This discovery allowed researches to study the localisation and levels of proteins in living single cells, for example the activity of kinases, and calcium levels, through the use of FRET reporters, as well as numerous other phenotypes.

Generally, these early studies focused on the localisation and behaviour of these fluorescently labelled proteins at the subcellular level over short periods of time. However, this changed with pioneering studies looking at the tumour suppressor p53 and the stress and inflammation related protein NF-κB, revealing there levels and localisation respectively to oscillate over periods of several hours. Live single-cell approaches were also applied around this time to understand signalling in single-cell organisms including bacteria, where live studies allowed the dynamics of competence to be modelled, and yeast revealing the mechanism underpinning coherent cell cycle entry.

== Experimental work flow ==
=== Fluorescent reporters ===
In any live single-cell study, the first step is to introduce a reporter for our protein/molecule of interest into a suitable cell line. Much of the growth in the field has come from improved gene editing tools such as CRISPR, this leading to development of a wide variety of fluorescent reporters.

Fluorescent tagging uses a gene encoding a fluorescent protein that is inserted into the coding frame of the protein to be tagged. Texture and intensity features can be extracted from images of the tagged protein.

Molecules can also be tagged in vitro and introduced into the cell with electrophoresis. This enable the use of smaller and more photostable fluorophores but requires additional washing steps.

By engineering expression of FRET reporter such that donor and emitter fluorophores are only in close proximity when an upstream signalling molecule is either active or inactive, the donor to emitter fluorescence intensity ratio can be used as a measure of signalling activity. For example, in key early work using FRET reporters for live single studies FRET reporters of Rho GTPase activity were engineered.

Nuclear translocation reporters use engineered nuclear import and nuclear export signals, which can be inhibited by signalling molecules, to record signalling activity via the ratio of nuclear reporter to cytoplasmic reporter.

=== Live imaging ===
Live-cell imaging of fluorescently labelled cells must then be performed. This requires simultaneous incubation of cells in stress free conditions whilst imaging is being performed. There are several factors that must be taken into account when choosing imaging conditions such as phototoxicity, photobleaching, tracking ease, rate of change of signalling activity, and Signal to noise. These all relate to imaging frequency and illumination intensity.

Phototoxicity can result from being exposed to large amounts of light over long periods of time. Cells will become stressed, which can lead to apoptosis. High frequency and intensity imaging can cause the fluorophore signal to decrease through photobleaching. Higher frequency imaging generally makes automated cell tracking easier. Imaging frequencies should be able to capture necessary changes to signalling activity. Low intensity imaging or poor reporters may prevent low levels of signalling activity within the cell from being detected.

=== Live-cell tracking ===
Following live-cell imaging, automated tracking software is then employed to extract time series data from videos of cells. Live-cell tracking is generally split into two steps, image segmentation of cells or their nuclei and cell/nuclei tracking based on these segments. Many challenges still exist in this stage of a live single-cell imaging study. However recent progress has been highlighted in the field first objective comparison of single-cell tracking techniques.

Quantitative phase imaging (QPI) is particularly useful for live-cell tracking. As QPI is label-free, it does not induce phototoxicity, nor does it suffer from the photobleaching associated with fluorescence imaging. QPI offers a significantly higher contrast than conventional phase imaging techniques, such as phase-contrast microscopy. The higher contrast facilitates more robust cell segmentation and tracking than achievable with conventional phase imaging.

New techniques that use a combination of traditional image segmentation techniques and deep learning to segment cells are also becoming more widely used as well.

=== Data analysis ===
In the final stage of a live single-cell imaging study, modelling and analysis of time series data extracted from tracked cells is performed. Pedigree tree profiles can be constructed to reveal heterogeneity in individual cell response and downstream signalling. Refining and compressing data from video-based single-cell tracking can provide relevant inputs for big data analysis, contributing to the identification of biomarkers for enhanced diagnosis and prognosis. A large overlap between analysis of single-cell live data, and modelling of biological systems using ordinary differential equations exists. Results from this key data analysis step will drive further experimentation, for example by perturbing aspects of the system being studied and then comparing signalling dynamics with those of the control population.

== Applications ==
By analysing the signalling dynamics of single cells across entire populations, live single-cell studies are now letting us understand how these dynamics affect key cellular decision making processes. For example, live single-cell studies of the growth factor ERK revealed it to possess digital all-or-nothing activation. Moreover, this all-or-nothing activation was pulsatile, and the frequency of pulses in turn determined whether mammalian cells would commit to cell cycle entry or not. In another key example, live single-cell studies of CDK2 activity in mammalian cells demonstrated that bifurcation in CDK2 activity following mitosis, determined whether cells would continue to proliferate or enter a state of quiescence; now shown, using live single-cell methods, to be caused by stochastic DNA damage inducing upregulation of p21, which inhibits CDK2 activity. Moving forward, live single-cell studies will now likely incooperate multiple reporters into single-cell lines to allow complex decision making processes to be understood, however challenges still remain in scaling up live single-cell studies.
