= Digital holographic microscopy =

Quantitative phase microscope

Chemical-etching measured in real-time

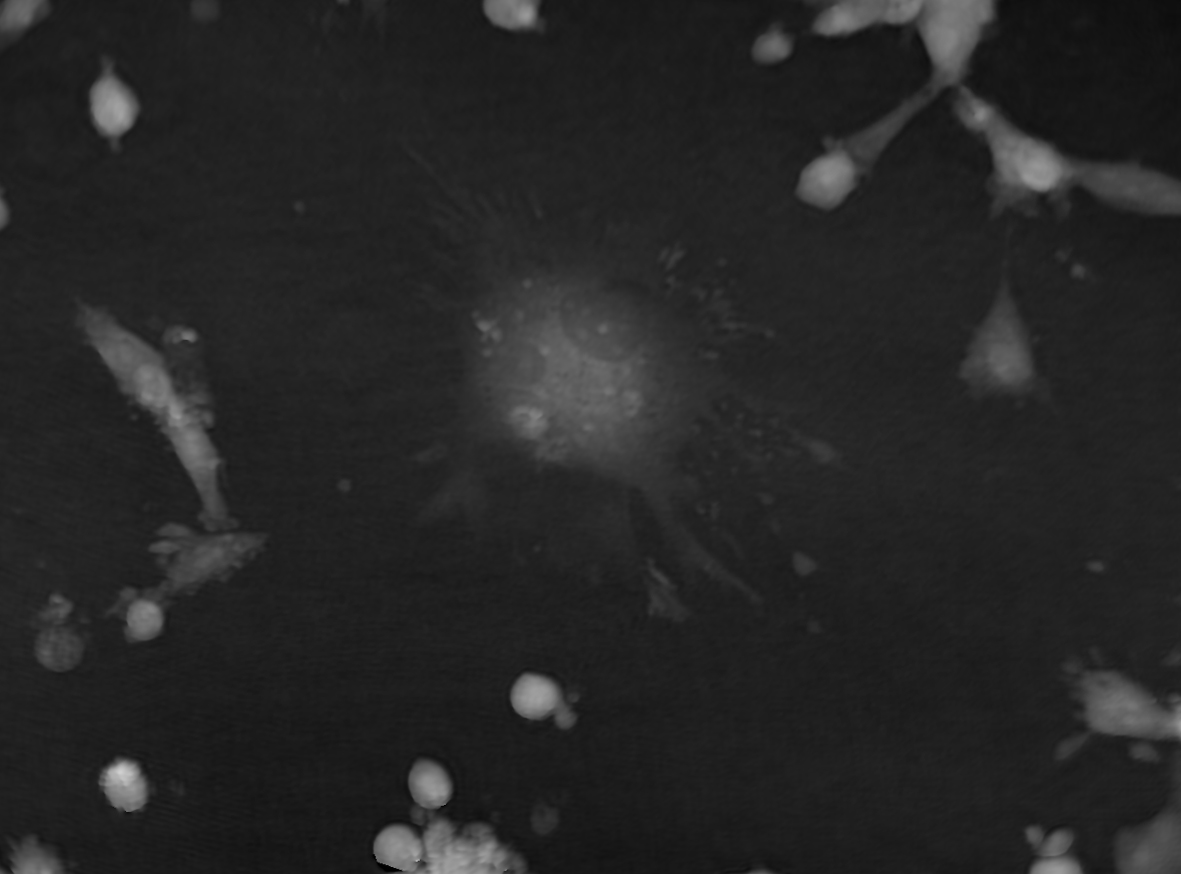
Figure 1. DHM phase shift image of cell details.

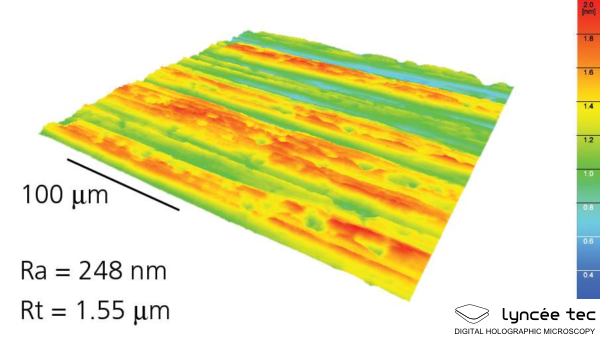
Surface finish measurement

Digital holographic microscopy (DHM) is digital holography applied to microscopy. Digital holographic microscopy distinguishes itself from other microscopy methods by not recording the projected image of the object. Instead, the light wave front information originating from the object is digitally recorded as a hologram, from which a computer calculates the object image by using a numerical reconstruction algorithm. The image forming lens in traditional microscopy is thus replaced by a computer algorithm. Other closely related microscopy methods to digital holographic microscopy are interferometric microscopy, optical coherence tomography and diffraction phase microscopy. Common to all methods is the use of a reference wave front to obtain amplitude (intensity) and phase information. The information is recorded on a digital image sensor or by a photodetector from which an image of the object is created (reconstructed) by a computer. In traditional microscopy, which do not use a reference wave front, only intensity information is recorded and essential information about the object is lost.

Holography was invented by Dennis Gabor to improve electron microscopy. Nevertheless, it never found many concrete and industrial applications in this field.

Actually, DHM has mostly been applied to light microscopy. In this field, it has shown unique applications for 3D characterization of technical samples and enables quantitative characterization of living cells. In materials science, DHM is routinely used for research in academic and industrial labs. Depending on the application, microscopes can be configured for both transmission and reflection purposes. DHM is a unique solution for 4D (3D + time) characterization of technical samples, when information needs to be acquired over a short time interval. It is the case for measurements in noisy environments, in presence of vibrations, when the samples move, or when the shape of samples change due to external stimuli, such as mechanical, electrical, or magnetic forces, chemical erosion or deposition and evaporation. In life sciences, DHM is usually configured in transmission mode. This enables label-free quantitative phase measurement (QPM), also called quantitative phase imaging (QPI), of living cells. Measurements do not affect the cells, enabling long-term studies. It provides information that can be interpreted into many underlying biological processes as explained in the section "Living cells imaging" below.

== Working principle ==
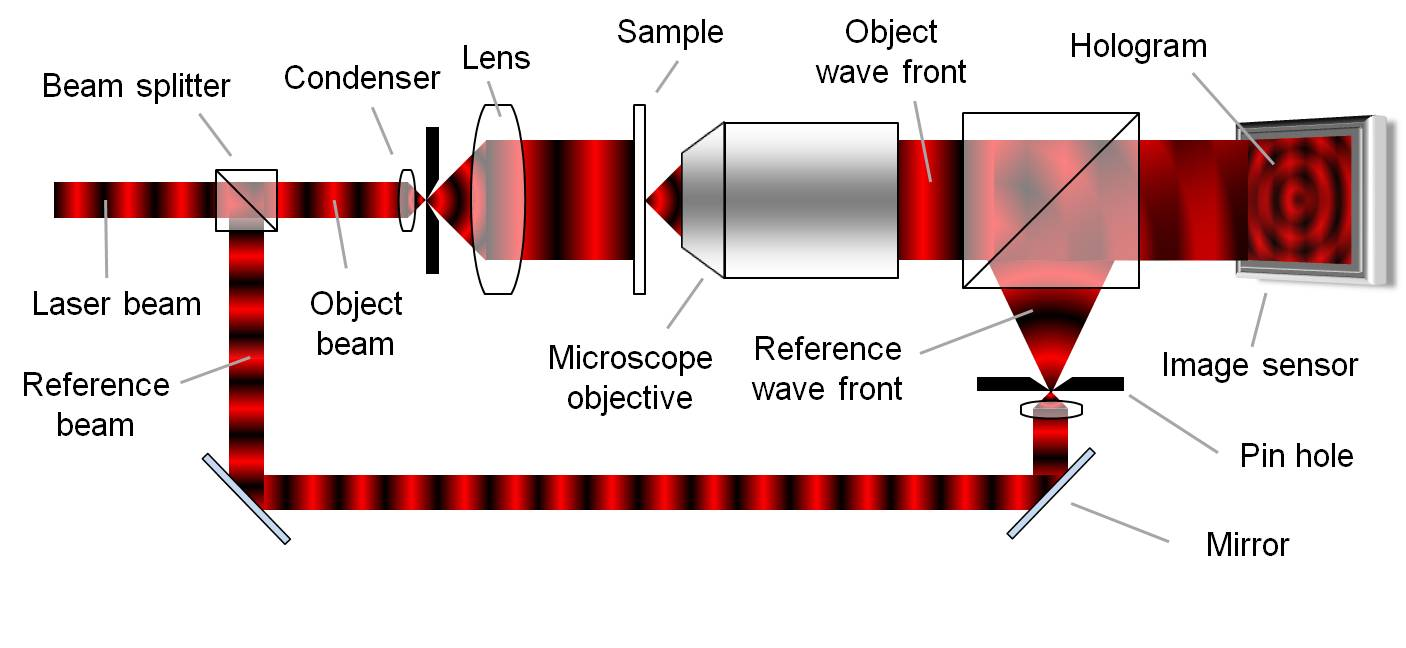
Figure 2. Typical optical setup of DHM.

To create the necessary interference pattern, i.e., the hologram, the illumination needs to be a coherent (monochromatic) light source, a laser for example. As can be seen in Figure 2, the laser light is split into an object beam and a reference beam. The expanded object beam illuminates the sample to create the object wave front. After the object wave front is collected by a microscope objective, the object and reference wave fronts are joined by a beam splitter to interfere and create the hologram. Using the digitally recorded hologram, a computer acts as a digital lens and calculates a viewable image of the object wave front by using a numerical reconstruction algorithm.

Commonly, a microscope objective is used to collect the object wave front. However, as the microscope objective is only used to collect light and not to form an image, it may be replaced by a simple lens. If a slightly lower optical resolution is acceptable, the microscope objective may be entirely removed.

Digital holography comes in different flavors, such as off-axis Fresnel, Fourier, image plane, in-line, Gabor and phase-shifting digital holography, depending on the optical setup. The basic principle, however, is the same; a hologram is recorded and an image is reconstructed by a computer.

The lateral optical resolution of digital holographic microscopy is equivalent to the resolution of traditional light microscopy. DHM is diffraction-limited by the numerical aperture, in the same way as traditional light microscopy. However, DHM offers a superb axial (depth) resolution. An axial accuracy of approximately 5 nm has been reported.

== Advantages ==
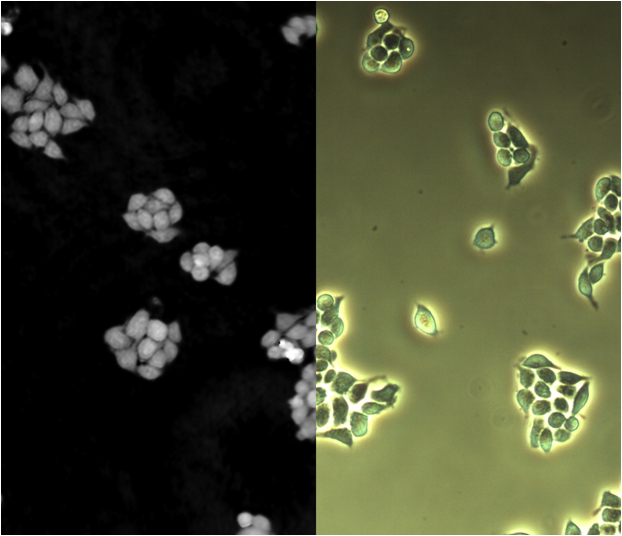
Figure 3. Comparison of a DHM phase shift image (left) and a phase-contrast microscopy image (right).

Phase shift images
Besides the ordinary bright-field image, a phase shift image is created as well. The phase shift image is unique for digital holographic microscopy and gives quantifiable information about optical distance. In reflection DHM, the phase shift image forms a topography image of the object.

Transparent objects, like living biological cells, are traditionally viewed in a phase-contrast microscope or in a differential interference contrast microscope. These methods visualize phase shifting transparent objects by distorting the bright field image with phase shift information. Instead of distorting the bright field image, transmission DHM creates a separate phase shift image showing the optical thickness of the object. Digital holographic microscopy thus makes it possible to visualize and quantify transparent objects and is therefore also referred to as quantitative phase-contrast microscopy.

Traditional phase contrast or bright field images of living unstained biological cells, Figure 3 (right), have proved themselves to be very difficult to analyze with image analysis software. On the contrary, phase shift images, Figure 3 (left), are readily segmented and analyzed by image analysis software based on mathematical morphology, such as CellProfiler.

3-dimensional information
An object image is calculated at a given focal distance. However, as the recorded hologram contains all the necessary object wave front information, it is possible to calculate the object at any focal plane by changing the focal distance parameter in the reconstruction algorithm. In fact, the hologram contains all the information needed to calculate a complete image stack. In a DHM system, where the object wave front is recorded from multiple angles, it is possible to fully characterize the optical characteristics of the object and create tomography images of the object.

Digital autofocus
Conventional autofocus is achieved by vertically changing the focal distance until a focused image plane is found. As the complete stack of image planes may be calculated from a single hologram, it is possible to use any passive autofocus method to digitally select the focal plane. The digital auto focusing capabilities of digital holography opens up the possibility to scan and image surfaces extremely rapidly, without any vertical mechanical movement. By recording a single hologram and afterwards stitch sub-images together that are calculated at different focal planes, a complete and focused image of the object may be created.

Optical aberration correction
As DHM systems do not have an image forming lens, traditional optical aberrations do not apply to DHM. Optical aberrations are "corrected" by design of the reconstruction algorithm. A reconstruction algorithm that truly models the optical setup will not suffer from optical aberrations.

Low cost
In optical microscopy systems, optical aberrations are traditionally corrected by combining lenses into a complex and costly image forming microscope objective. Furthermore, the narrow focal depth at high magnifications requires precision mechanics. The needed components for a DHM system are inexpensive optics and semiconductor components, such as a laser diode and an image sensor. The low component cost in combination with the auto focusing capabilities of DHM, make it possible to manufacture DHM systems for a very low cost.

== Applications ==
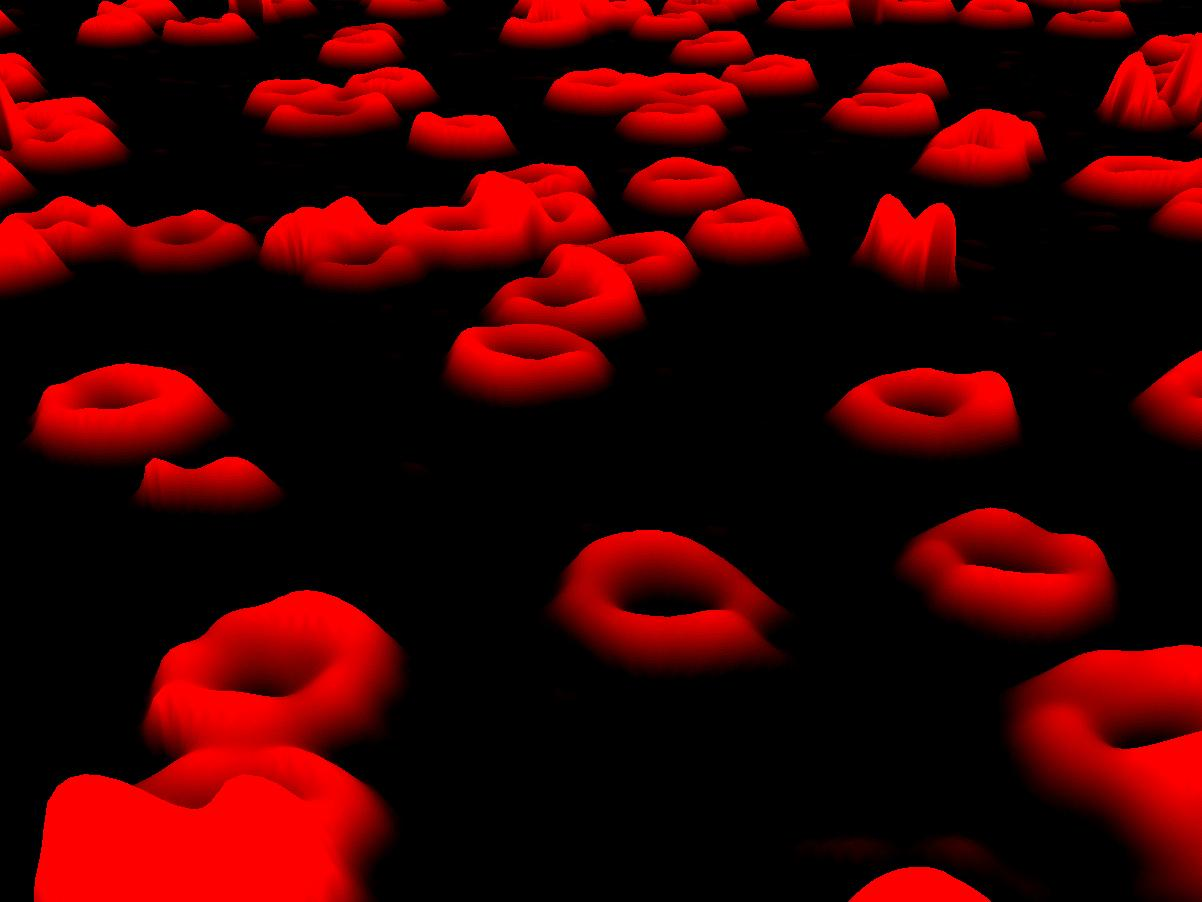
Figure 4. DHM phase shift image of human red blood cells.

Digital holographic microscopy has been successfully applied in a range of application areas.

=== Living cells imaging ===
However, due to DHM's capability of non-invasively visualizing and quantifying biological tissue, bio-medical applications have received most attention. Examples of bio-medical applications are:

- Label-free cell counting in adherent cell cultures. Digital holographic microscopy makes it possible to perform cell counting and to measure cell viability directly in the cell culture chamber. Today, the most commonly used cell counting methods, hemocytometer or Coulter counter, only work with cells that are in suspension.
- Label-free viability analysis of adherent cell cultures. Digital holography has been used to study the apoptotic process in different cell types. The refractive index changes taking place during the apoptotic process are easily measured with DHM.
- Label-free cell cycle analysis. The phase shift induced by cells has been shown to be correlated to the cell dry mass. The cell dry mass can be combined with other parameters obtainable by digital holography, such as cell volume and refractive index, to provide a better understanding of the cell cycle.
- Label-free morphology analysis of cells. Digital holography has been used in different contexts to study cell morphology using neither staining nor labeling. This can be used to follow processes such as the differentiation process where cell characteristics change. DHM has also been used for automated plant stem cell monitoring, and made it possible to distinguish between two types of stem cells by measuring morphological parameters.
- Label free nerve cell studies. Digital holographic microscopy makes it possible to study undisturbed processes in nerve cells as no labeling is required. The swelling and shape changing of nerve cells caused by cellular imbalance was easily studied.

Figure 5. Time-lapse of unstained, dividing and migrating cells.

- Label-free high content analysis. Fluorescent high content analysis/screening has several drawbacks. Label-free alternatives based on phase shift images have therefore been proposed. The capability of DHM to obtain phase shift images rapidly over large areas opens up new possibilities of very rapid quantitative characterization of the cell cycle and the effects of specific pharmacological agents.
- Red blood cell analysis. Phase shift images have been used to study red blood cell dynamics. Red blood cell volume and hemoglobin concentration has been measured by combining information from absorption and phase shift images to facilitate complete blood cell count by holographic microscopy. It has furthermore been shown that phase shift information discriminates immature red blood cells from mature, facilitating unstained reticulocyte count.
- Flow cytometry and particle tracking and characterization. Images created by digital holography are calculated from the recorded hologram at any time after the actual recording and at any given focal plane. By combining several images calculated from the same hologram, but at different focal planes, an increased depth of field may be obtained, which is vastly superior to what can be achieved with traditional light microscopy. The increased depth of field makes it possible to image and characterize the morphology of cells and particles while in suspension. Observations may be done directly in a microfluidic channel or statically in an observation chamber.
- Time-lapse microscopy of cell division and migration. The autofocus and phase shift imaging capabilities of digital holographic microscopy makes it possible to effortlessly create label-free and quantifiable time-lapse video clips of unstained cells for cell migration studies. In Figure 5 a label-free time-lapse of dividing and migrating cells is shown.
- Tomography studies. Digital holographic microscopy allows for label-free and quantifiable analysis of subcellular motion deep in living tissue.

=== Surface 3D topography ===
DHM performs static measurements of 3D surface topography as many other 3D optical profilometers (white light interferometers, confocal, focus variation, ... ). It enables to retrieve, roughness and shape of many surfaces. Use of multiple wavelengths enable to overcome the l/4 limit of traditional phase shifting interferometers. Applications have been demonstrated on many samples such as medical implants, watch components, micro components, micro-optics.

=== Time resolved applications ===
Self-healing surface recovering from a scratch : real-time measurement

As DHM measures the 3D surface topography over the full field of view within a single camera acquisition, there is no need for scanning, neither vertical, nor lateral. Consequently, dynamic changes of topography are measured instantaneously. The acquisition rate is only limited by the camera frame. Measurements have been demonstrated on many types of samples such as smart surface, self-healing surfaces, not equilibrium systems, evaporation processes, electrodeposition, evaporation, crystallization, mechanical deformation, etc.

=== MEMS ===
Ultrasonic Transducers measured at 8 MHz in stroboscopic mode

Use in conjunction with a stroboscopic electronic unit to synchronize the laser pulse for sample illumination and the camera acquisition with the MEMS excitation, DHM® provides time sequences of 3D topography along the excitation phase of the microsystems. Analysis of this time sequence of 3D topographies acquired at a fixed frequency provides vibration map and enable decomposition of the movement in term of in- and out-of-plane.

Sweeping of the excitation frequency provides structural resonances as well as amplitude and phase Bode analysis. Measurement have demonstrated on many type of MEMS such as comb drive actuators, micro-mirrors, accelerometers, gyroscopes, micro pumps, microphones, ultrasonic transducers, cantilevers, and surface acoustic waves among others.

=== Metrology ===
DHM refers only to wavelengths for height measurement. Therefore, DHM provides precise height measurements with very high repeatability and linearity independently of any vertical calibration, precise positioning of mechanical part, repeatability of interferometric piezo-controller, motorized displacement, or liquid crystal display scanning. This feature makes out of DHM an outstanding tool for step and roughness certification among other. For transmission systems, perfect flatness calibration is achieved by taking as reference an acquisition without any sample in the optical path. Flatness calibration of reflection type systems requires the use of a perfectly flat sample.

=== Industrial inspection ===
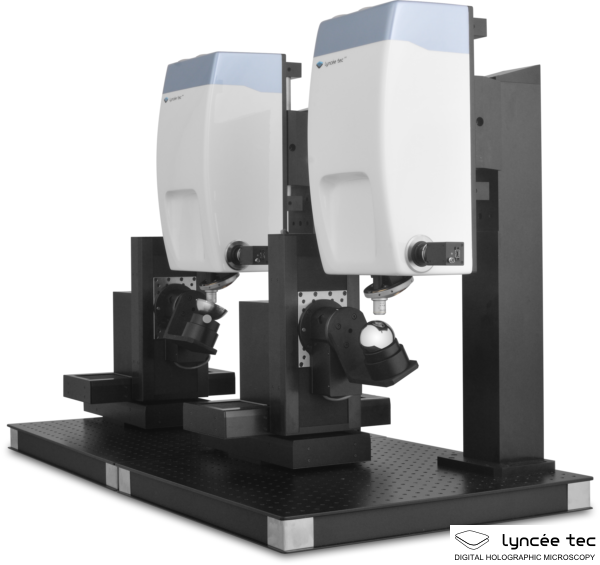
Automatic measurement of hip prosthesis : surface roughness characterization

The very short time needed to capture information makes DHM very robust to environmental vibrations. It enables in particular "on-flight" and "on-line" quality controls of parts. Applications have been demonstrated in particular for implants roughness, structure of semiconductor components, solar industry, industrial metrology, and watch parts, among others.

=== Micro optics ===
Micro optics arrays fast measurement and inspection have been demonstrated and compared successfully with measurement made with other profilometers.

Extended depth of focus algorithms based on digital focalization enables have a sharp focus over the full lens surface, even for high NA samples. DHM has been also applied to dynamical characterization of variable lenses.

=== 3D particle tracking ===
3D particle tracking has been demonstrated in numerous publications [to be completed]. A Z-stack of measurement can be reconstructed digitally from a single hologram using a range of propagation distances. Specific algorithms enable to determine for each particle the distance corresponding to its best focus. Performing this operation on a time-sequence of holograms enables to determine the trajectories of particles.

== History ==
The first reports of replacing the photographic hologram of classical holography by digitally recording the hologram and numerically reconstructing the image in a computer were published in the late 1960s and in the early 1970s. In 1975, Tokyo University researchers Sadao Aoki and Seishi Kikuta invented a 3D medical imaging holographic X-ray microscope. Similar ideas were proposed for the electron microscope in the early 1980s. However, computers were too slow and recording capabilities were too poor for digital holography to be useful in practice.

After the initial excitement, digital holography went into a similar hibernation as holography had experienced about two decades earlier. (Note that in the 1960s, "digital holography" could mean either to compute an image from a hologram or to compute a hologram from a 3D model. The latter developed in parallel with classical holography during the hiatus, and during that time, "digital holography" was synonymous with what is now known as computer generated holography.)

In the mid-1990s, digital image sensors and computers had become powerful enough to reconstruct images with some quality, but still lacked the required pixel count and density for digital holography to be anything more than a curiosity. At the time, the market driving digital image sensors was primarily low-resolution video, and so those sensors provided only PAL, NTSC, or SECAM resolution. This suddenly changed at the beginning of the 21st century with the introduction of digital still image cameras, which drove demand for inexpensive high-pixel-count sensors. As of 2010, affordable image sensors can have up to 60 megapixels. In addition, the CD and DVD-player market has driven development of affordable diode lasers and optics.

The first reports of using digital holography for light microscopy came in the mid-1990s. However, it was not until the early 2000s that image sensor technology had progressed far enough to allow images of a reasonable quality. During this time, the first commercial digital holographic microscopy companies were founded. With increased computing power and use of inexpensive high-resolution sensors and lasers, digital holographic microscopy is today finding applications primarily within life science, oceanology and metrology.

== See also ==
- Digital holography
- Quantitative phase contrast microscopy
- Holographic interferometry
- Holotomography
- Holography
- Microscopy
