= Holographic interference microscopy =

Phase Micro-objects

Holographic interference microscopy (HIM) is holographic interferometry applied for microscopy for visualization of phase micro-objects. Phase micro-objects are invisible because they do not change intensity of light, they insert only invisible phase shifts. The holographic interference microscopy distinguishes itself from other microscopy methods by using a hologram and the interference for converting invisible phase shifts into intensity changes.

Other microscopy methods related to holographic interference microscopy are phase contrast microscopy and holographic interferometry.

== Holographic interference microscopy methods ==
Holography was born as "new microscopy principle". D. Gabor invented holography for electron microscopy. For some reasons his idea is not applied in this branch of microscopy. But invention of holography opened up new possibilities in imaging of phase micro-objects due to the application of the holographic interference methods in microscopy that allow not only qualitative, but quantitative study. Combining the holographic interference microscopy with methods of numerical processing has solved the problem of 3D imaging of untreated, native biological phase micro-object.

In the holographic interference method the images appear as the result of the interference of two object waves passed the same path through the microscope optical system but in different points of time: the reconstructed from the hologram "empty" object wave, and the object wave disturbed by the phase micro-objects under study. The hologram of the "empty" object wave is recorded using a reference beam, and it is used as an optical element of the holographic interference microscope. In the dependence on conditions of the interference two methods of the holographic interference microscopy can be realized: the holographic phase-contrast method and the holographic interference-contrast method. In the first case, the phase shifts inserted by the phase micro-object into the light wave passing through it are converted into intensity changes in its image; and in the second case – into deviations of interference fringes.

== Holographic phase-contrast method ==
Holographic phase-contrast method is the holographic interference microscopy technique for phase micro-object visualization that converts the phase shifts inserted by the micro-object to the wave of light passed through it into intensity changes in the image. The method is based on the holographic addition (constructive interference) or holographic subtraction (destructive interference) of the "empty" wave reconstructed from the hologram, and the object wave disturbed by the phase micro-objects under study. The image can be considered as interferogram in interference fringes of infinite width.

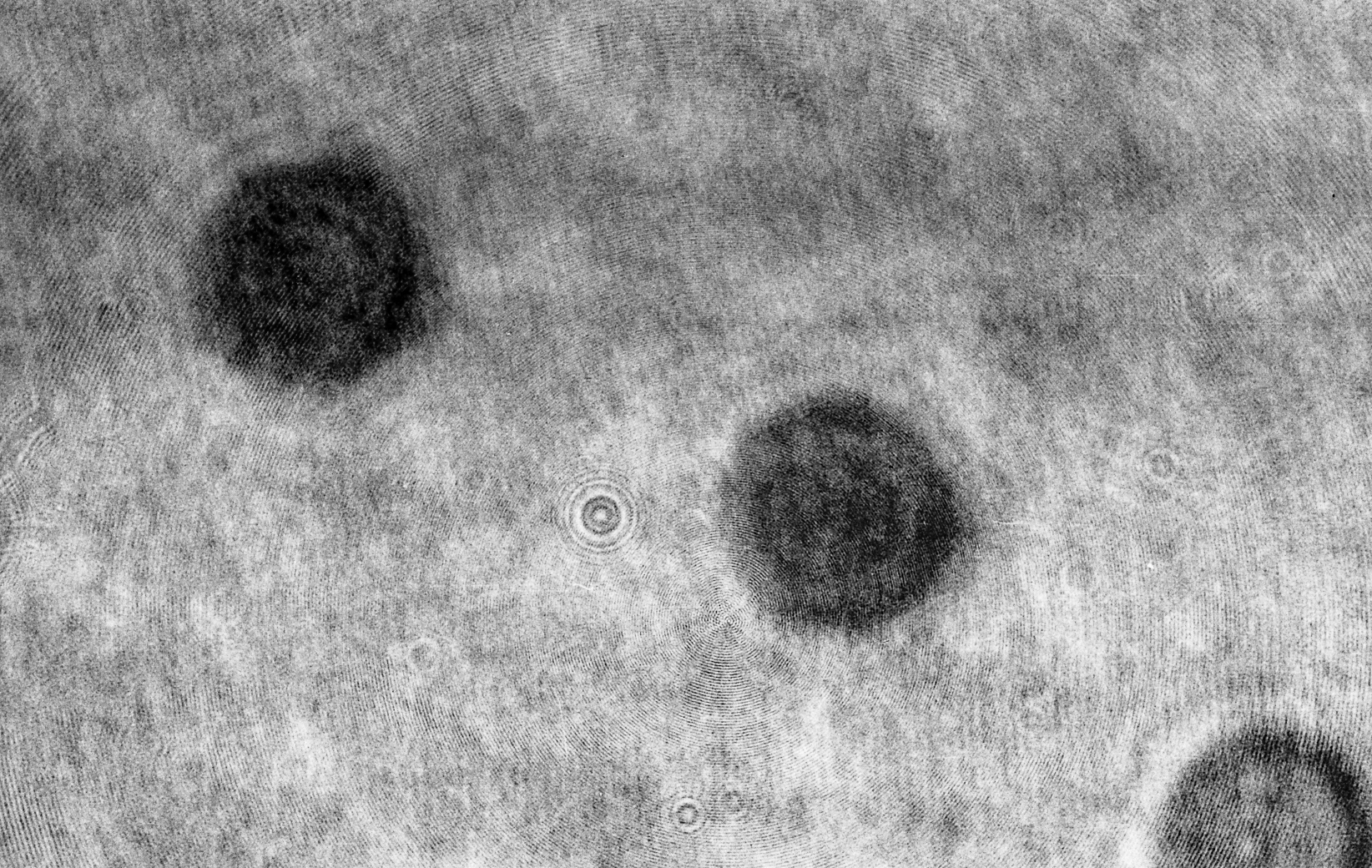
Phase-contrast image of human blood erythrocytes obtained by the wave addition in a bright interference fringe

The method solves the same problem as does F. Zernike phase contrast method. But in comparison with F. Zernike phase contrast method, the method has some advantages. Due to equal intensities of the interfering waves, the holographic phase-contrast method allows obtaining maximal contrast of images. The sizes of the micro-object do not restrict the application of the method, though F. Zernike phase contrast method works the more successfully, the smaller the micro-object in thick and sizes. The image in the holographic phase-contrast method is the result of interaction of two identical waves, and it is free of aberrations.

The method can be realized as the method of holographic addition and subtraction in an interference fringe. A small angle is introduced between the interfering waves so that the period of resulting system of interference fringes significantly exceeds the size of the images. The conditions for the waves to be antiphased or in-phased (holographic subtraction or addition) are automatically created within a dark and bright interference fringes, correspondingly.

The intensities in the image of the micro-object $I_{im+}$ and the intensity of the background $I_{b+}$ in the case of wave addition in a bright interference fringe are determined by the expressions:

$I_{im+} (x',y')=2I_0[1+cos f (x, y) ]$; $I_{b+}=4I_0$

and the intensities in the image of the micro-object $I_{im-}$ and the intensity of the background $I_{b-}$ in the case of wave subtraction in the dark interference fringe (waves are antiphased):

$I_{im-}(x', y')=2I_0[1-cos f (x, y) ]$; $I_{b-}=0$

where $f (x, y)$ is the phase shift inserted by the micro-object into the wave transmitted through it; $I_0$ is the intensity of each of the two waves. So, dark images of phase micro-objects can be observed against the bright background in the case of wave addition, and bright images against the dark background – in the case of wave subtraction. The contrast of images is maximal.

The intensity distribution in the images depends on the phase shifts inserted by the micro-objects under study. So, the method allows measuring the phase shifts, and 3D images of the phase micro-objects can be reconstructed under computer processing of their phase-contrast images.

The high sensitivity to vibrations is the main backgrounds of the method. It requires developing the hologram in its place. So, the method remains "exotic", and it is not widely applied.

== Holographic interference-contrast method ==
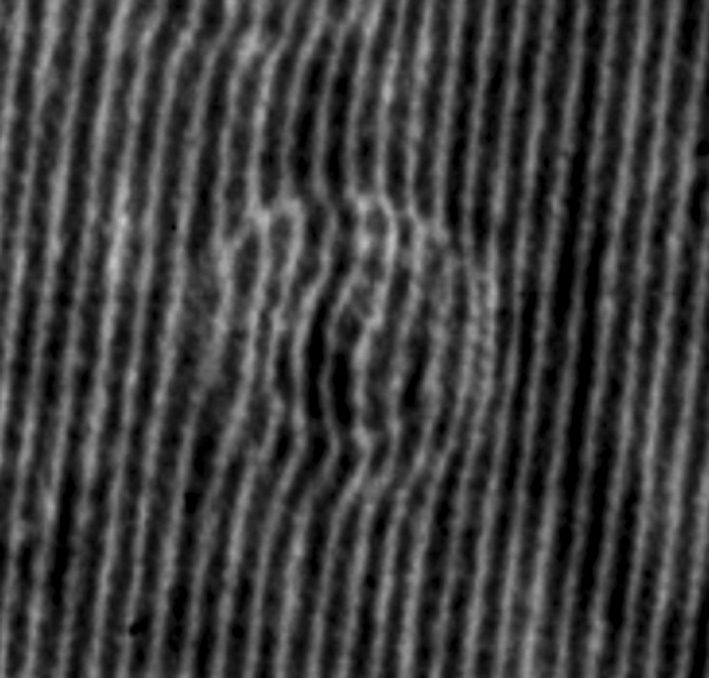
An interferogram of blood erythrocyte

Holographic interference-contrast method is the holographic interference microscopy technique for phase micro-object visualization that converts the phase shifts inserted by the micro-object to the passed light wave light into deviations of interference fringes in its image. A certain angle is introduced between the "empty" wave and the wave disturbed by the phase micro-objects so the system of straight interference fringes is obtained, which are deviated in the image of the micro-object. The image can be considered as an interferogram in the fringes of finite width. The deviation $h(x',y')$ of the interference fringe in a point of the image is linearly dependent on the phase shift $f (x, y)$ inserted in the corresponding point of the micro-object:

$h(x',y')=f(x, y) T/2 \pi$,

where $T$ is the set period of the system of interference fringes. So, the interference-contrast image (interferogram) visualizes phase silhouette of the micro-object in the form of the deviated lines; and the phase shifts can be measured just by a "ruler". This makes it possible to calculate optical thickness of the micro-object in every point. The method allows measuring thickness of the micro-object if its refractive index is known or to measure its refractive index if the thickness is known. If the micro-object has a homogeneous refractive index distribution, it is possible to reconstruct its physical 3D shape under digital processing the images.

The method can be used for thick and thin, small and large micro-objects. Due to equal intensities of the interfering waves, contrast of images is maximal. The "empty" wave reconstructed from the hologram is a replica of the object wave. So, due to interference of identical waves optical aberrations of the optical system are compensated, and images are free of optical aberrations.

Both methods of holographic interference microscopy can be realized in a single device of the holographic interference microscope uses an optical microscope in an off-axis conventional holographic set-up, with the reference wave, which is usual for the holography, a laser as a coherent source of light, and the hologram. The "empty" object wave produced by the objective in the absence of the micro-objects under study is recorded on the hologram using the reference wave. The developed hologram is returned in its original position, and it works as a fixed optical element of the holographic interference microscope. The images appear under simultaneous observation of the real object wave disturbed by micro-object and the "empty" object wave reconstructed from the hologram. The period of the observed interference picture is adjusted just by cross shift of the hologram from its initial position.

The main background of the HIM methods are coherent noise and speckle structure of the images appearing as the result of using a coherent source of light.

The methods of holographic interference microscopy were worked out and applied for phase micro-object study in the 1980s.

In the late 1990s, a computer began to be used for 3D imaging of phase micro-objects by their interferograms. 3D images were obtained for the first time when investigating blood erythrocytes. From the beginning of the 21st century, holographic interference microscopy has become digital holographic interference microscopy.

== Digital holographic interference microscopy ==
Digital holographic interference microscopy (DHIM) is a combination of the holographic interference microscopy with digital methods of image processing for 3D imaging of phase micro-objects. The holographic phase-contrast or interference-contrast images (interferograms) are recorded by a digital camera from which a computer reconstructs 3D images by using numerical algorithms.

The closest method to the digital holographic interference microscopy is the digital holographic microscopy. The both method solve the same problem of micro-object 3D imaging. Both method use the reference wave to obtain phase information. The digital holographic interference microscopy is more "optical" method. This makes this method more obvious and precise, it uses clear and simple numerical algorithms. The digital holographic microscopy is more "digital" method. It is not so obvious; application of complicated approximate numerical algorithms does not allow reaching the optical accuracy.

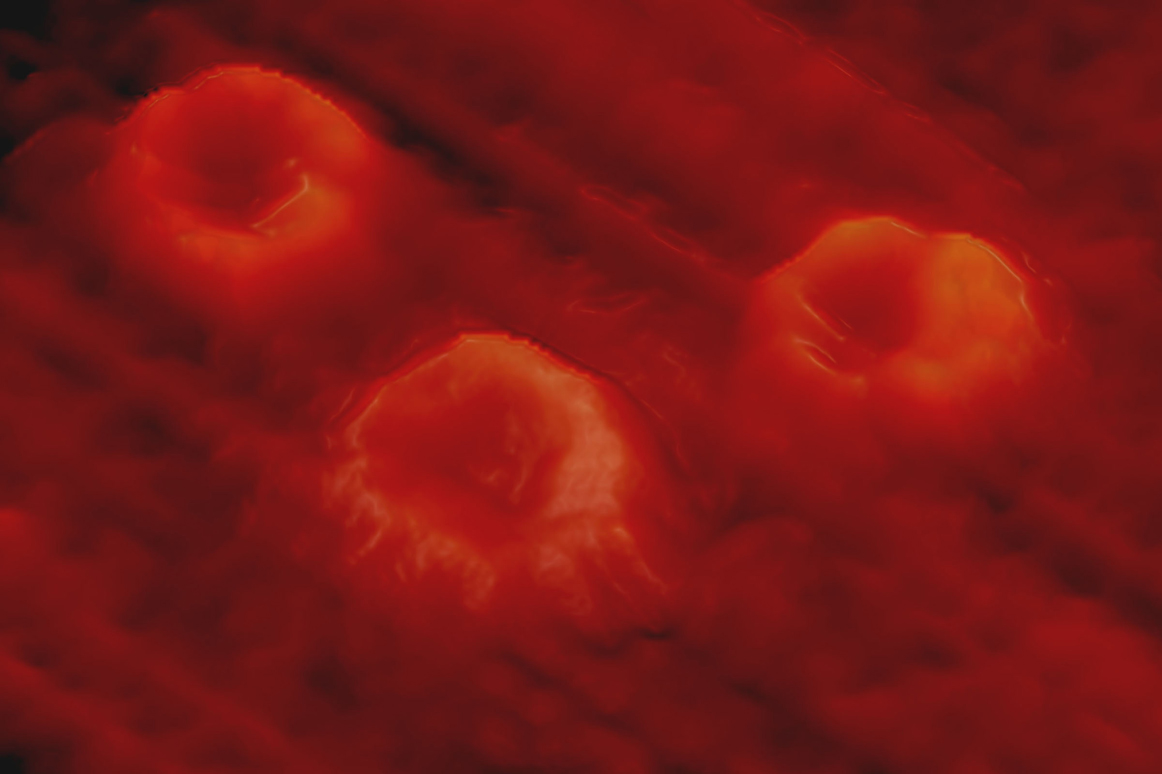
3D image of a native human blood smear

Digital holographic interference microscopy allows 3D imaging and non-invasive quantitative study of biomedical micro-objects, such as cells of an organism. The method has been successfully used for study of 3D morphology of blood erythrocytes in different diseases; to study how ozone therapy affects the shape of erythrocytes, to study alteration of 3D shape of blood erythrocytes in a patient with sickle-cell anemia when the oxygen concentration in blood was reduced, and the effect of gamma-radiation in a superlethal dose on the shape of rat erythrocytes.

The method can be used for measurements of thickness of thin transparent films, crystals, and/or 3D imaging of their surfaces for quality control.

== See also ==
- Digital holographic microscopy
- Holography
- Microscopy
