= Time-lapse microscopy =

Type of microscopy

Time-lapse microscope
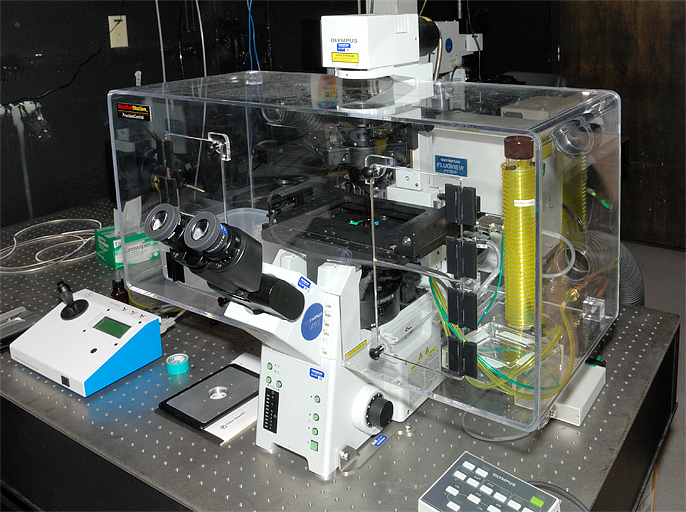
- A time-lapse microscope. The transparent cell incubator is necessary to keep cells alive during observation.
- Other names: (Time-lapse) microcinematograph, (Time-lapse) video microscope, Time-lapse cinemicrograph
- Uses: Observation of slow microscopic processes
- Inventor: Jean Comandon and other contemporaries
- Related items: Time-lapse photography, Live-cell imaging

Time-lapse microscopy is time-lapse photography applied to microscopy. Microscope image sequences are recorded and then viewed at a greater speed to give an accelerated view of the microscopic process.

Before the introduction of the video tape recorder in the 1960s, time-lapse microscopy recordings were made on photographic film. During this period, time-lapse microscopy was referred to as microcinematography. With the increasing use of video recorders, the term time-lapse video microscopy was gradually adopted. Today, the term video is increasingly dropped, reflecting that a digital still camera is used to record the individual image frames, instead of a video recorder.

== Applications ==
A time-lapse movie of dividing cancer cells, created by using a phase-contrast microscope.

Cell division over 42 hours. The time-lapse movie was created by using a phase microscope.

Jean Comandon, pioneer of microcinematography, recorded this time-lapse film in c. 1910, using an ultramicroscope. The film show living spiral shaped syphilis bacteria moving among red blood cells of frog. Notice the back-and-forth movement, characterizing the disease-causing form.

Time-lapse microscopy can be used to observe any microscopic object over time. However, its main use is within cell biology to observe artificially cultured cells. Depending on the cell culture, different microscopy techniques can be applied to enhance characteristics of the cells as most cells are transparent.

To enhance observations further, cells have therefore traditionally been stained before observation. Unfortunately, the staining process kills the cells. The development of less destructive staining methods and methods to observe unstained cells has led to that cell biologists increasingly observe living cells. This is known as live-cell imaging. A few tools have been developed to identify and analyze single cells during live-cell imaging.

Time-lapse microscopy is the method that extends live-cell imaging from a single observation in time to the observation of cellular dynamics over long periods of time. Time-lapse microscopy is primarily used in research, but is clinically used in IVF clinics as studies has proven it to increase pregnancy rates, lower abortion rates and predict aneuploidy

Modern approaches are further extending time-lapse microscopy observations beyond making movies of cellular dynamics. Traditionally, cells have been observed in a microscope and measured in a cytometer. Increasingly this boundary is blurred as cytometric techniques are being integrated with imaging techniques for monitoring and measuring dynamic activities of cells and subcellular structures.

== History ==
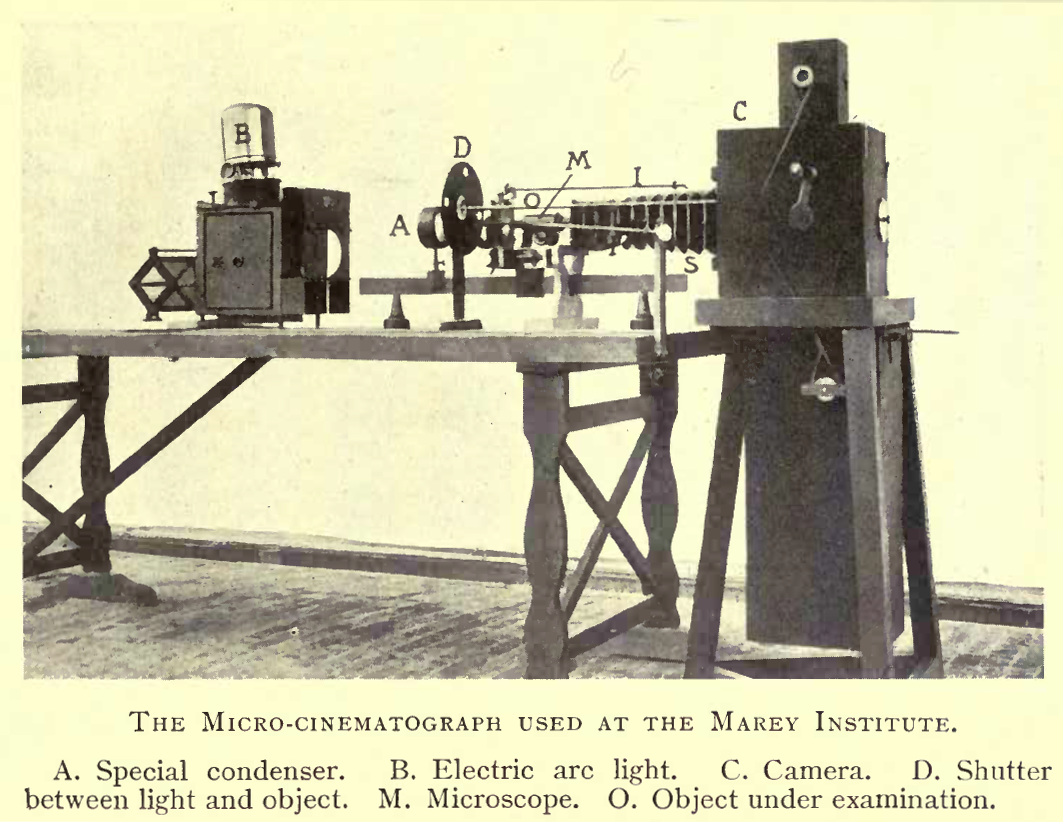
One of the microcinematographs used at the Marey Institute during the late 19th century

The Cheese Mites by Martin Duncan from 1903 is one of the earliest microcinematographic films. However, the early development of scientific microcinematography took place in Paris. The first reported time-lapse microscope was assembled in the late 1890s at the Marey Institute, founded by the pioneer of chronophotography, Étienne-Jules Marey. It was, however, Jean Comandon who made the first significant scientific contributions around 1910.

Comandon was a trained microbiologist specializing in syphilis research. Inspired by Victor Henri's microcinematic work on Brownian motion, he used the newly invented ultramicroscope to study the movements of the syphilis bacteria. At the time, the ultramicroscope was the only microscope in which the thin spiral shaped bacteria were visible. Using an enormous cinema camera bolted to the fragile microscope, he demonstrated visually that the movement of the disease-causing bacteria is uniquely different from the non-disease-causing form. Comandon's films proved instrumental in teaching doctors how to distinguish the two forms.

Comandon's extensive pioneering work inspired others to adopt microcinematography. Heniz Rosenberger builds a microcinematograph in the mid-1920s. In collerboration with Alexis Carrel, they used the device to further develop Carrel's cell culturing techniques. Similar work was conducted by Warren Lewis.

During World War II, Carl Zeiss AG released the first phase-contrast microscope on the market. With this new microscope, cellular details could for the first time be observed without using lethal stains. By setting up some of the first time-lapse experiments with chicken fibroblasts and a phase-contrast microscope, Michael Abercrombie described the basis of our current understanding of cell migration in 1953.

With the broad introduction of the digital camera at the beginning of this century, time-lapse microscopy has been made dramatically more accessible and is currently experiencing an unrepresented raise in scientific publications.

== See also ==
- Live-cell imaging
  - Live single-cell imaging
- Cytometry
- Time-lapse photography
