= Interferometric microscopy =

Interferometric microscopy or imaging interferometric microscopy is the concept of microscopy which is related to holography, synthetic-aperture imaging, and off-axis-dark-field illumination techniques. Interferometric microscopy allows enhancement of resolution of optical microscopy due to interferometric (holographic) registration of several partial images (amplitude and phase) and the numerical combining.

== Combining of partial images ==
In interferometric microscopy, the image of a micro-object is synthesized numerically as a coherent combination of partial images with registered amplitude and phase. For registration of partial images, a conventional holographic set-up is used with a reference wave, as is usual in optical holography. Capturing multiple exposures allows the numerical emulation of a large numerical aperture objective from images obtained with an objective lens with smaller-value numerical aperture. Similar techniques allows scanning and precise detection of small particles. As the combined image keeps both amplitude and phase information, the interferometric microscopy can be especially efficient for the phase objects, allowing detection of light variations of index of refraction, which cause the phase shift or the light passing through for a small fraction of a radian.

== Non-optical waves ==
Although the Interferometric microscopy has been demonstrated only for optical images (visible light), this technique may find application in high resolution atom optics, or optics of neutral atom beams (see Atomic de Broglie microscope), where the Numerical aperture is usually very limited .

== Fiber Optic Interference Microscopy (FOIM) ==
FOIM is a form of Interferometric microscopy used for label free monitoring of single molecules. FOIM utilizes a microfiber with random defects across its surface to act as nanoscale scatterers. A laser is used to excite an evanescent wave that is scattered by the roughness of the surface of the microfiber. When a single-molecule binding event occurs, the localized refractive index is disturbed by the strong light-matter interaction at the fiber-liquid interface This induces a phase shift and changes the localized intensity of scattering spots. The scattering can be detected using an inverted microscope and charge coupled device (CCD) camera.The CCD converts light photons into electric charges used to create images. Since the images are of localized positions, the noise signal from adjacent regions is isolated. This provides a high signal to noise ratio and improves resolution. Through this imaging molecular interactions can be analyzed without labels and with high sensitivity.

== See also ==
- Digital holographic microscopy
- Holography
- Numerical aperture
- Raman microscope
- Diffraction limited
