= J. Lawrence Smith (chemist) =

American physician, chemist and mineralogist

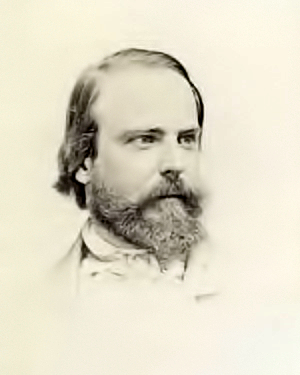
- Born: December 17, 1818
- Died: October 12, 1883 (aged 64); Louisville, Kentucky, US
- Education: University of Virginia; Medical College of South Carolina
- Known for: Invention of the inverted microscope
- Scientific career
- Fields: Chemistry
- Workplaces: University of Virginia; University of Louisville

John Lawrence Smith (December 17, 1818 – October 12, 1883) was an American chemist and mineralogist.

He published extensively on analytical chemistry and mineralogy, including Mineralogy and Chemistry, Original Researches (1873; enlarged with biographical sketches, 1884). His collection of meteorites was the finest in the United States, and upon his death, he passed it to Harvard. The J. Lawrence Smith Medal is named in his honor.

== Education ==
J. Lawrence Smith was reportedly born either near Charleston, South Carolina, or in Louisville, Kentucky. He was educated at the University of Virginia, he entered the Medical College of South Carolina, receiving a medical degree in 1840. His graduation thesis was an essay on the "Compound Nature of Nitrogen."

He then went to Europe to continue his studies. In Paris he studied widely, taking classes in chemistry, toxicology, physics, mineralogy and geology. His teachers there included Théophile-Jules Pelouze. After meeting Justus von Liebig in Giessen, Germany, he spent his summers studying in Giessen and his winters studying in Paris.

== Career ==
By 1843, he had returned to the United States. In 1844 he began the practice of medicine at Charleston. In 1846, he helped to establish the Medical and Surgical Journal of South Carolina. His tastes, however, clearly tended more towards chemical analysis than towards medicine. He spent much of his time improving methods for analytical chemistry, and applying them to problems in chemical analysis.

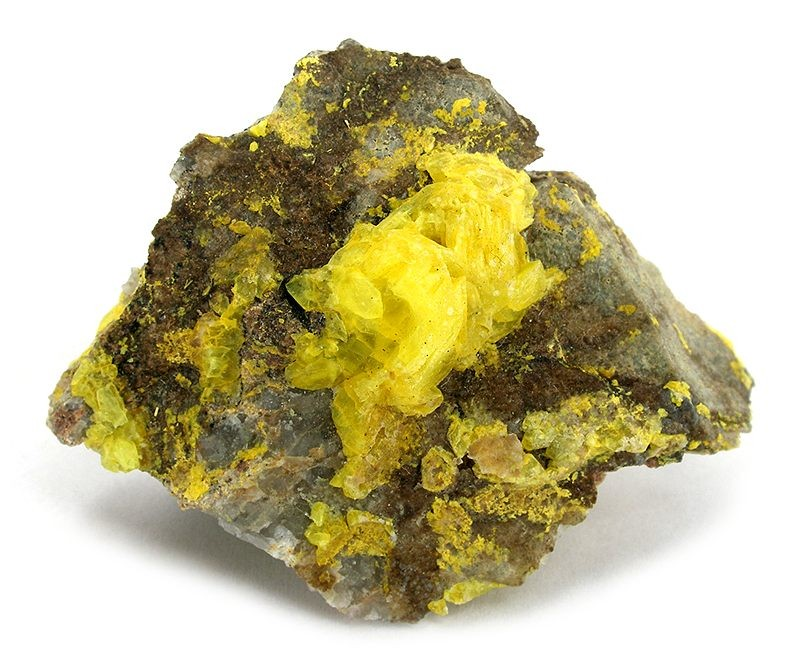
The mineral liebigite

He examined various problems in agricultural chemistry, including the composition of soils, the value of marls and fossil bones, and the growing of cotton. As a result, he was selected by Secretary James Buchanan to go to Turkey, in response to a request from the Sultan of Turkey for a scientific advisor on cultivating cotton. Between 1846 and 1850, Smith investigated the mineral resources of Turkey, for Turkey's government, and he discovered deposits of coal, chrome ore, and the famous emery deposits of Naxos.

In Turkey he discovered liebigite, naming it after Justus von Liebig.

Smith returned to the United States in 1850, and perfected the inverted microscope, an invention which he had begun working on while abroad. He was apparently offered a professorship at the University of New Orleans, but wrote in December, 1850, that it "at present exists but in name." Some of his papers from this period style him as professor of chemistry at the University of Louisiana (now Tulane University), New Orleans, Louisiana. By October 9, 1851, he was visiting Charleston. He described himself as a "peripatetic philosopher" and lamented his lack of a settled laboratory, writing "All my scientific labors have as yet been carried on in the Gipsey style."

On June 24, 1852, J. Lawrence Smith married Sarah Julia Guthrie, daughter of James Guthrie. In the autumn of 1852 he took up a professorship in the chair of chemistry at the University of Virginia, replacing Robert Empie Rogers, who moved to Philadelphia. This proved particularly productive for Smith's scientific research. His publications included a method for analyzing the alkaline silicates, work he had begun in Paris. This was an important contribute to analytical methods.

As a result of his father-in-law's appointment as Secretary of the Treasury in 1853, the couple moved to Washington, D.C. where Sarah served as a hostess for her father. Smith was able to do some work at the Smithsonian Institution and gave lectures for the US Department of Agriculture, but had little opportunity for research.

James Guthrie had helped to found the University of Louisville, and in 1854 Smith took over a position there as chair and Professor of Medical Chemistry and Toxicology in the university's medical department. He replaced Benjamin Silliman Jr., who moved to Yale. Smith remained at Louisville from 1854 until 1866, resigning not long after the death of James Guthrie.

Smith was elected to the American Philosophical Society in 1857.

After 1866, he spent much of his time traveling in Europe, collecting, studying and writing about "aerolites". His interest in meteorites predated his retirement from Louisville; his earliest paper on the subject was read before the American Association for the Advancement of Science in April, 1854. The last paper he published, in the American Journal of Sciences, 1883, was "On the peculiar concretions in meteoric iron."

Smith served as president of the American Association for the Advancement of Science (1872) and of the American Chemical Society (1877).

Smith purchased a collection of meteorites that had belonged to Gerard Troost of Nashville, Tennessee, and extended it by collecting specimens from all over the world. He attempted to obtain specimens from as many different meteoric falls as possible. His collection was estimated to contain specimens from about two hundred and fifty falls, with a combined weight of around twenty-five hundred pounds, He wished his collection to be kept together, and after his death it became the property of Harvard College.
