= Condenser (optics) =

Type of optical lens

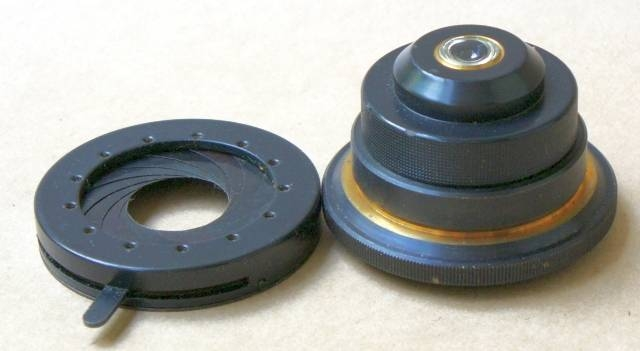
A condenser (right) and its respective diaphragm (left)

A condenser is an optical lens that renders a divergent light beam from a point light source into a parallel or converging beam to illuminate an object to be imaged.

Condensers are an essential part of any imaging device, such as microscopes, enlargers, slide projectors, and telescopes. The concept is applicable to all kinds of radiation undergoing optical transformation, such as electrons in electron microscopy, neutron radiation, and synchrotron radiation optics.

== Microscope condenser ==
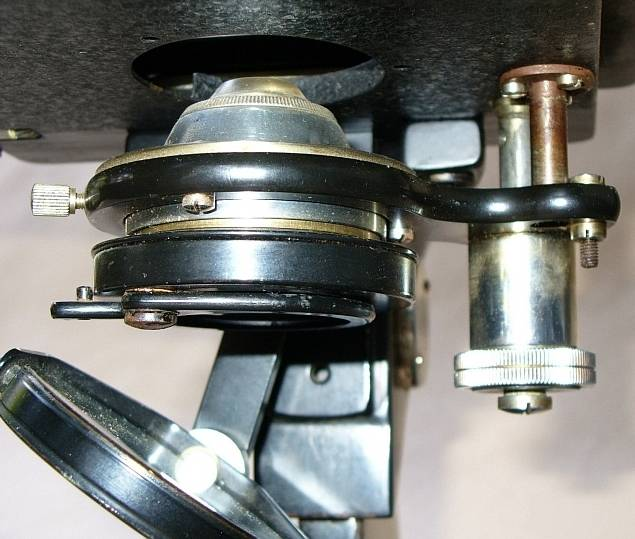
A condenser between the stage and mirror of a vintage microscope

Condensers are located above the light source and under the sample in an upright microscope, and above the stage and below the light source in an inverted microscope. They act to gather light from the microscope's light source and concentrate it into a cone of light that illuminates the specimen. The aperture and angle of the light cone must be adjusted (via the size of the diaphragm) for each different objective lens with different numerical apertures.

Condensers typically consist of a variable-aperture diaphragm and one or more lenses. Light from the illumination source of the microscope passes through the diaphragm and is focused by the lens(es) onto the specimen. After passing through the specimen the light diverges into an inverted cone to fill the front lens of the objective.

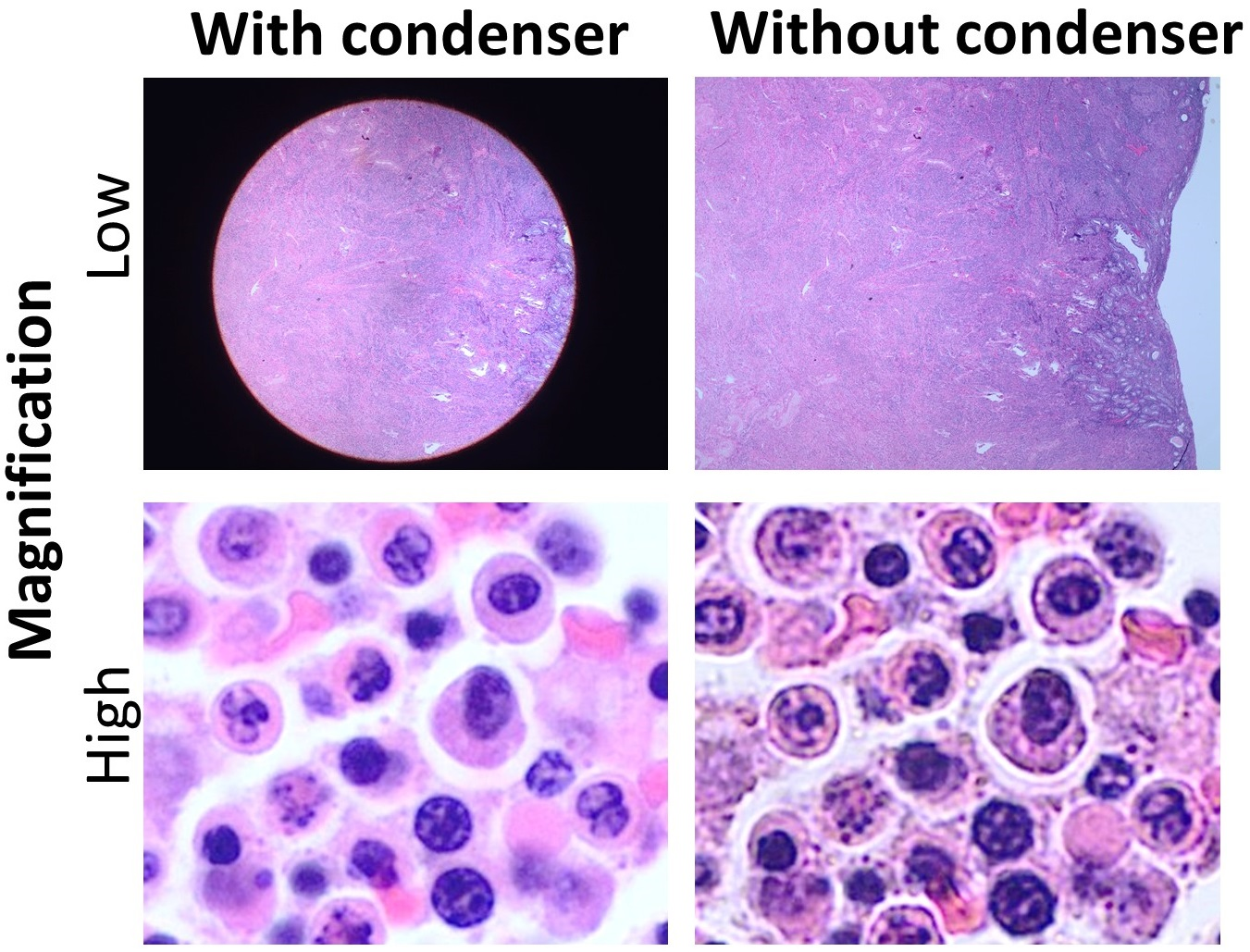
Light microscopy with and without condenser. At low magnification, using a condenser may limit the field of view, and in such cases it is preferable to not use it. At high magnification, a condenser makes borders less marked, and is generally preferable in such cases.

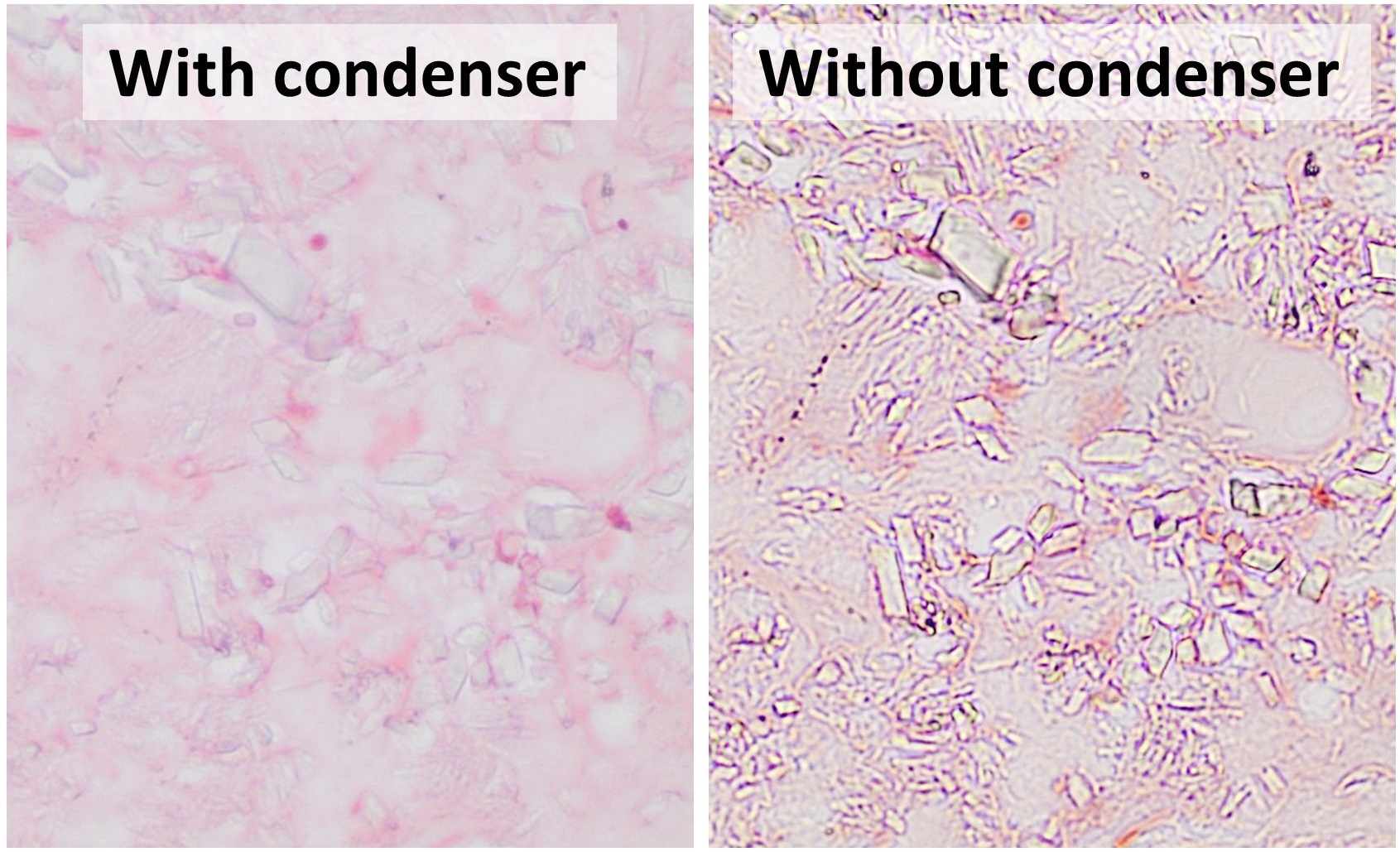
An example of a situation where microscopy without condenser is preferable at high magnification is the evaluation of crystals (calcium pyrophosphate dihydrate crystal deposition disease pictured).

=== Types ===
There are three main types of microscope condenser:

1. The chromatic condenser, such as the Abbe where no attempt is made to correct for spherical or chromatic aberration. It contains two lenses that produce an image of the light source that is surrounded by a blue and red color at its edges.
2. The aplanatic condenser is corrected for spherical aberration.
3. The compound achromatic condenser is corrected for both spherical and chromatic aberrations.

==== Abbe condenser ====
The sub-stage condenser focuses light through the specimen to match the aperture of the objective lens system.

The Abbe condenser is named for its inventor Ernst Abbe, who developed it in 1870. The Abbe condenser, which was originally designed for Zeiss, is mounted below the stage of the microscope. The condenser concentrates and controls the light that passes through the specimen prior to entering the objective. It has two controls, one which moves the Abbe condenser closer to or further from the stage, and another, the iris diaphragm, which controls the diameter of the beam of light. The controls can be used to optimize brightness, evenness of illumination, and contrast. Abbe condensers are difficult to use for magnifications of above 400X, as the aplanatic cone is only representative of a numerical aperture (NA) of 0.6.

This condenser is composed of two lenses, a plano-convex lens somewhat larger than a hemisphere and a large bi-convex lens serving as a collecting lens to the first. The focus of the first lens is traditionally about 2mm away from the plane face coinciding with the sample plane. A pinhole cap can be used to align the optical axis of the condenser with that of the microscope. The Abbe condenser is still the basis for most modern light microscope condenser designs, even though its optical performance is poor.

==== Aplanatic and achromatic condensers ====
An aplanatic condenser corrects for spherical aberration in the concentrated light path, while an achromatic compound condenser corrects for both spherical and chromatic aberration.

==== Specialized condensers ====
Dark field and phase contrast setups are based on an Abbe, aplanatic, or achromatic condenser, but to the light path add a dark field stop or various size phase rings. These additional elements are housed in various ways. In most modern microscope (ca. 1990s–), such elements are housed in sliders that fit into a slot between the illuminator and the condenser lens. Many older microscopes house these elements in a turret-type condenser, these elements are housed in a turret below the condenser lens and rotated into place.

Specialised condensers are also used as part of Differential Interference Contrast and Hoffman Modulation Contrast systems, which aim to improve contrast and visibility of transparent specimens.

In epifluorescence microscopy, the objective lens acts not only as a magnifier for the light emitted by the fluorescing object, but also as a condenser for the incident light.

The Arlow-Abbe condenser is a modified Abbe condenser that replaces the iris diaphragm, filter holder, lamp and lamp optics with a small OLED or LCD digital display unit. The display unit allows for digitally synthesised filters for dark-field, Rheinberg, oblique and dynamic (constantly changing) illumination under direct computer control. The device was first described by Dr. Jim Arlow in Microbe Hunter magazine, issue 48.

=== Condensers and numerical aperture ===
Like objective lenses, condensers vary in their numerical aperture (NA). It is NA that determines optical resolution, in combination with the NA of the objective. Different condensers vary in their maximum and minimum numerical aperture, and the numerical aperture of a single condenser varies depending on the diameter setting of the condenser aperture. In order for the maximum numerical aperture (and therefore resolution) of an objective lens to be realized, the numerical aperture of the condenser must be matched to the numerical aperture of the used objective. The technique most commonly used in microscopy to optimize the light pathway between the condenser (and other illumination components of the microscope) and the objective lens is known as Köhler illumination.

The maximum NA is limited by the refractive index of the medium between the lens and the sample. As with objective lenses, a condenser lens with a maximum numerical aperture of greater than 0.95 is designed to be used under oil immersion (or, more rarely, under water immersion), with a layer of immersion oil placed in contact with both the slide/coverslip and the lens of the condenser. An oil immersion condenser may typically have NA of up to 1.25. Without this oil layer, not only is maximum numerical aperture not realized, but the condenser may not be able to precisely focus light on the object. Condensers with a numerical aperture of 0.95 or less are designed to be used without oil or other fluid on the top lens and are termed dry condensers. Dual dry/immersion condensers are basically oil immersion condensers that can nonetheless focus light with the same degree of precision even without oil between the top lens and the slide.

=== History ===
The first simple condensers were introduced on pre-achromatic microscopes in the 17th century. Robert Hooke used a combination of a salt water filled globe and a plano-convex lens, and shows in the 'Micrographia' that he understands the reasons for its efficiency. Makers in the 18th century such as Benjamin Martin, Adams and Jones understood the advantage of condensing the area of the light source to that of the area of the object on the stage. This was a simple plano-convex or bi-convex lens, or sometimes a combination of lenses. With the development of the modern achromatic objective in 1829, by Joseph Jackson Lister, the need for better condensers became increasingly apparent. By 1837, the use of the achromatic condenser was introduced in France, by Felix Dujardin, and Chevalier. English makers early took up this improvement, due to the obsession with resolving test objects such as diatoms and Nobert ruled gratings. By the late 1840s, English makers such as Ross, Powell and Smith; all could supply highly corrected condensers on their best stands, with proper centring and focus. It is erroneously stated that these developments were purely empirical - no-one can design a good achromatic, spherically corrected condenser relying only on empirics. On the Continent, in Germany, the corrected condenser was not considered either useful or essential, mainly due to a misunderstanding of the basic optical principles involved. Thus the leading German company, Carl Zeiss in Jena, offered nothing more than a very poor chromatic condenser into the late 1870s. French makers, such as Nachet, provided excellent achromatic condensers on their stands. When the leading German bacteriologist, Robert Koch, complained to Ernst Abbe that he was forced to buy a Seibert achromatic condenser for his Zeiss microscope in order to make satisfactory photographs of bacteria, Abbe produced a very good achromatic design in 1878.

== Bibliography ==
General

- "Abbe condenser", Photonics Dictionary (abridged online edition), Pittsfield MA: Laurin Publishing, 2006.
- "Abbe, Ernst", Encyclopædia Britannica.
- "Glossary of microscope terms", Microbus (website), 2003.
- "Anatomy of the Microscope: Substage Condenser" by Mortimer Abramowitz and Michael W. Davidson, Olympus Microscopy Resource Center, 2006.
