= Lili Bleeker =

Dutch physicist (1897-1985)

Caroline Emilie "Lili" Bleeker
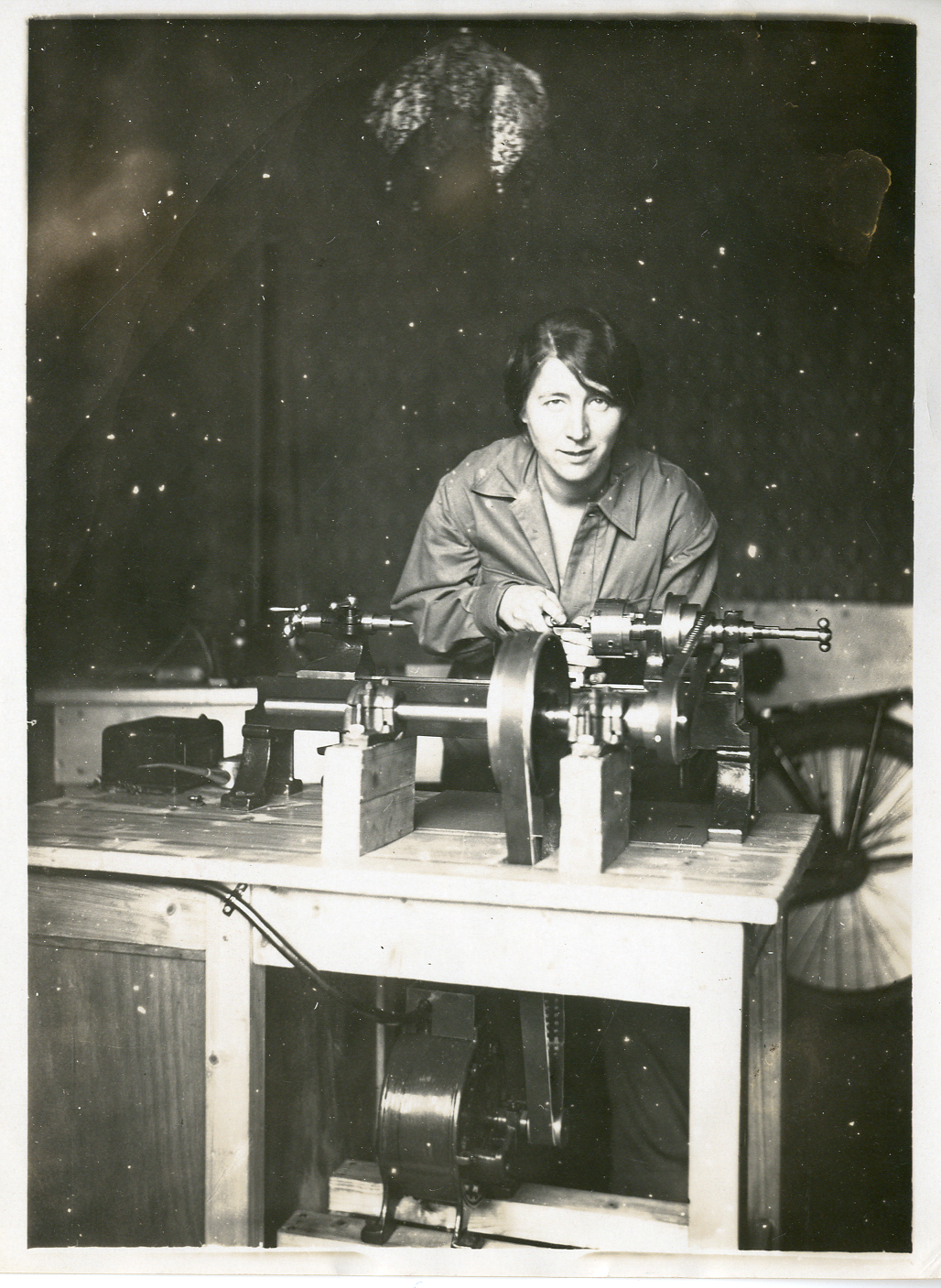
- Dr. Caroline Bleeker
- Born: 17 January 1897; Middelburg
- Died: 8 November 1985 (aged 88); Zeist

Dr Caroline Emilie "Lili" Bleeker (17 January 1897 – 8 November 1985) was a Dutch entrepreneur and physicist from Middelburg known for her designs and the manufacturing of optical instruments. She would emerge as one of the first women in the Netherlands to become a doctor in physics and mathematics. After earning her PhD, she founded a physics consultancy firm, which served as an influence for the formation of TNO, and extended her firm by establishing a small factory where scientific and optical instruments were produced.

Dr Bleeker's firm took a huge hit during the Second World War. Bleeker, along with her partner Gerard Willemse had to go into hiding due to her successfully hiding Jews from the German raids on her factory. Because of her actions in the war, Bleeker was awarded the Royal Distinction by the Dutch army, and was later granted a recovery loan by the government to open up a new factory in Zeist.

Her company manufactured the optical instruments required for the development of Zernike's phase contrast microscope. Zernike received the Nobel Prize for this in 1953, with Bleeker holding the patents on the design.

== Early life and education ==
Caroline Bleeker was born on 17 January 1897 as the youngest of five children to John Lambert Bleeker, a local Lutheran preacher, and Martha Gerhardina Döhne, a housewife. She grew up in Middelburg and showed great brilliance as a young child, skipping a year in primary school. Although Bleeker was a top student, she was discouraged by her mother from continuing her studies. However, Bleeker had her sights set on education.

In 1916, she enrolled at the University of Utrecht in the Netherlands to study physics and astronomy. Bleeker became a teacher at an all-girls secondary school to pay her tuition, but soon left to become a private tutor, feeling that she was too young. In 1919, she became a laboratory assistant at the Sonnenborgh Observatory, and on 1 January 1926 was named as sole head assistant. On the 5th November 1928 she earned her PhD in physics Cum laude from Utrecht University with Professor Leonard Ornstein, who described her as 'very intelligent and well educated, both theoretically and experimentally.' Bleeker's Ph.D. thesis was on measurements of emission and dispersion in the series spectra of alkali metals. The printing office that printed her thesis was owned by the father of her fellow student and later life partner, Gerard Willemse.

== Career ==
On 5 June 1930, eighteen months after receiving her degree, Dr Bleeker started a successful physics consultancy which advised companies and industries on scientific instruments. Her consultancy firm served as a model for the foundation of TNO in 1932. Dr Bleeker then opened a factory for the construction of scientific and optical equipment. The company's original focus was hardware for the laboratory and precision electric measuring instruments. However, in 1936, Dr Bleeker decided to start an optical workshop, and in 1937 started production on optical instruments. She was part of the vanguard for the burgeoning optical industry in the Netherlands, and worked closely with others in the field, such as Bram van Heel, who helped start the first Dutch optics department at the TU Delft.

=== World War II ===
In 1938, Dr Bleeker entered negotiations to develop prism binoculars for the Dutch military. However, the contract was cancelled after the German occupation of the Netherlands in 1940, to prevent German use of the technology. Almost all other orders were also cancelled. The company also shrank in terms of staff due to evacuations, and was only kept open due to Jewish people in hiding in the building. In 1944, the Nazi Feldgendarmerie raided the building. Dr Bleeker and Willemse were arrested and interrogated, but Willemse's father was caught with proofs of the illegality. Dr Bleeker supplied prism binoculars for the Resistance and, after her company was looted, had to go into hiding herself.

Immediately after the liberation, the factory was cleaned up and restarted with the help of most of the employees. Dr Bleeker received a royal distinction and repair credit from the Dutch government. The factory was also given a different name: "Nederlandsche Optiek- en Instrumentenfabriek" or NEDOPTIFA. The company was located in three buildings on the Korte Nieuwstraat in Utrecht.

=== NEDOPTIFA ===
In 1949, the company was converted into a public limited company, partly to attract investors from outside for the relatively expensive business operations, with a registered capital of f3,020,000. In the same year, NEDOPTIFA moved from Utrecht to a much larger new building at Thorbeckelaan 3 in Zeist. The new building was designed by Dirk van der Lingen and was opened by Minister In 't Veld.

At this new location, the workforce increased even further, from around 120 employees to 150 by1953. In this new factory, the production of new products was started, such as larger microscopes. New types of prism telescopes were also introduced to the market. The extensive delivery programme of microscopes served a wide range of research areas. Universities and companies at home and abroad became customers. However, the war damage in combination with high investment costs caused financial problems.

NEDOPTIFA was the first company in the world to produce complete phase contrast microscopes. The success of these microscopes- for which scientist and professor Frits Zernike won a Nobel Prize in 1953- gave the company an extra boost. The patent for this microscope was registered in two names, Zernike and Bleeker.

The Dutch queen, Juliana, came to visit in 1961. Director Dr Bleeker herself gave a tour.

The 1960s were turbulent for the company. The company's results were poor and other companies such as Philips were buying employees away with better salary conditions. Dr Bleeker was criticized for her authoritarian management style, whilst also struggling with the fact that she was already over 60 and her work was becoming physically more difficult. A new management was appointed in 1963, and Dr Bleeker and Willemse were honorably discharged from their duties.

Dr Bleeker and Willemse did not visit the factory often after their dismissal. Their departure was regretted by, among others, Frits Philips. He sent Bleeker and Willemse a letter in which he wrote:

(...) we find it very difficult to imagine the Dutch Optics and Instruments Factory without both of you, who have put such a special personal stamp on this company.

— Frits Philips

The management of the company was transferred to A.N. Nolke. Under him, a merger with Delft-based company Oldelft took place in 1970 but to no avail. In 1978, NEDOPTIFA closed its doors. The factory building was demolished in 1992.

== Awards and honors ==
- There is a building at Utrecht University named after Dr Bleeker.
