= Holotomography =

Holotomography (HT) is a laser technique to measure the three-dimensional refractive index (RI) tomogram of a microscopic sample such as biological cells and tissues. Because the RI can serve as an intrinsic imaging contrast for transparent or phase objects, measurements of RI tomograms can provide label-free quantitative imaging of microscopic phase objects. In order to measure 3-D RI tomogram of samples, HT employs the principle of holographic imaging and inverse scattering. Typically, multiple 2D holographic images of a sample are measured at various illumination angles, employing the principle of interferometric imaging. Then, a 3D RI tomogram of the sample is reconstructed from these multiple 2D holographic images by inversely solving light scattering in the sample.

== History ==
The first theoretical proposal was presented by Emil Wolf, and the first experimental demonstration was shown by Fercher et al. From 2000s, HT techniques had been extensively studied and applied to the field of biology and medicine, by several research groups including the MIT spectroscopy laboratory. Both the technical developments and applications of HT have been significantly advanced. In 2012 the first commercial HT company Nanolive was founded, later followed by Tomocube in 2014.

== Principles ==
The principle of HT is very similar to X-ray computed tomography (CT) or CT scan. CT scan measures multiple 2-D X-ray images of a human body at various illumination angles, and a 3-D tomogram (X-ray absorptivity) is then retrieved via the inverse scattering theory. Both the X-ray CT and laser HT shares the same governing equation – Helmholtz equation, the wave equation for a monochromatic wavelength. HT is also known as optical diffraction tomography.

== Advantages and limitations ==
HT provides following advantages over conventional 3D microscopic techniques.

1. Label-free: Cellular membrane and subcellular organelles can clearly be imaged without using exogenous labeling agents. Thus, there are no issues of phototoxicity, photobleaching and photodamaging.
2. Quantitative imaging capability: HT directly measures cell's 3D RI maps, which is intrinsic optical properties of materials. Because the measured RI can be translated into the mass density of a cell and using this information, mass of a cell can also be retrieved.
3. Precise and fast measurements: HT provides the spatial resolution down to approximately 100 nm and the temporal resolution of a few to a hundred frames per second, depending on the numerical apertures of used objective lenses and the speed of an image sensor.

However, 3D RI tomography does not provide molecular specificity. Generally, the measured RI information cannot be directly related to information about molecules or proteins, except for notable cases such as gold nanoparticles or lipid droplets that exhibit distinctly high RI values compared to cell cytoplasm.

== Applications ==
The applications of HT include:

3D RI tomogram of a live cell (macrophage)

=== Cell biology ===
HT provides 3D dynamic images of live cells and thin tissues without using exogenous labeling agents such as fluorescence proteins or dyes. HT enables quantitative live cell imaging, and also provides quantitative information such as cell volume, surface area, protein concentration. The label-free imaging and quantification of chromosomes were presented. The regulatory pathway of proteasome degradation by autophagy in cells were studies using HT.

=== Correlative imaging ===
HT can be used with other imaging modalities for correlative imaging. For example, a combination of HT and fluorescence imaging enables a synergistic analytic approach. HT provides structural information whereas fluorescence signal provides molecular specific imaging, an optical analogous to positron emission tomography (PET) and CT. Various approaches have been reported for correlative imaging approaches using HT.

=== Lipid quantification ===
Intracellular lipid droplets play important roles in energy storage and metabolism, and are also related to various pathologies, including cancer, obesity, and diabetes mellitus. HT enables label-free and quantitative imaging and analysis for free or intracellular lipid droplets. Because lipid droplets have distinctly high RI (n > 1.375) compared to other parts of cytoplasm, the measurements of RI tomograms provide information about the volume, concentration, and dry mass of lipid droplets. Recently, HT was used to evaluate the therapeutic effects of a nanodrug designed to affect the targeted delivery of lobeglitazone by measuring lipid droplets in foam cells.

=== Experimental laboratory ===
HT provide various quantitative imaging capability, providing morphological, biochemical, and mechanical properties of individuals cells. 3D RI tomography directly provides morphological properties including volume, surface area, and sphericity (roundness) of a cell. Local RI value can be translated into biochemical information or cytoplasmic protein concentration, because the RI of a solution is linearly proportional to its concentration. In particular, for the case of red blood cells, RI value can be converted into hemoglobin concentration. Measurements of dynamic cell membrane fluctuation, which can also be obtained with a HT instrument, provides information about cellular deformability. Furthermore, these various quantitative parameters can be obtained at the single cell level, allowing correlative analysis between various cellular parameters. HT has been utilized for the study of red blood cells, white blood cells, blood storage, and diabetes.

=== Infectious diseases ===
The quantitative label-free imaging capability of HT have been exploited for the study of various infectious diseases. In particular, parasites-invaded host cells can be effectively imaged and studied using HT. This is because the staining or labeling of parasites requires complicated preparation process and the staining/labeling is not very effective in several parasites. The invasion of plasmodium falciparum, or malaria inducing parasites, to individual red blood cells were measured using HT. The structural and biophysical alteration to host cells and parasites have been systematically analyzed. The invasion of babesia parasites to red blood cells were also studied. Toxoplasma gondii, an apicomplexan parasite causing toxoplasmosis, can infect nucleated cells. The alterations of 3D morphology and biophysical properties of T. gondii infected cells were studied using HT.

=== Biotechnology ===
The cell volume and dry mass of individual bacteria or micro algae can be effectively quantified using HT. Because it does not require the staining process while providing the precise quantification values, HT can be used for testing the efficacy of engineered stains.

== Scientific community ==
The following are active scientific conferences on HT, as a part of quantitative phase imaging techniques:

- Quantitative phase imaging conference, SPIE Photonics West

The HT technique and applications have been included in the following special issues of scientific journals:

- Special Issue on Quantitative Phase Imaging for Label-Free Cytometry in Cytometry Part A, 2019
- Research Topic on Quantitative Phase Imaging and Its Applications to Biophysics, Biology, and Medicine in Frontiers in Physics

== See also ==
- Quantitative phase imaging
- Digital holographic microscopy
- Holography
