= Inverted microscope =

Type of microscope

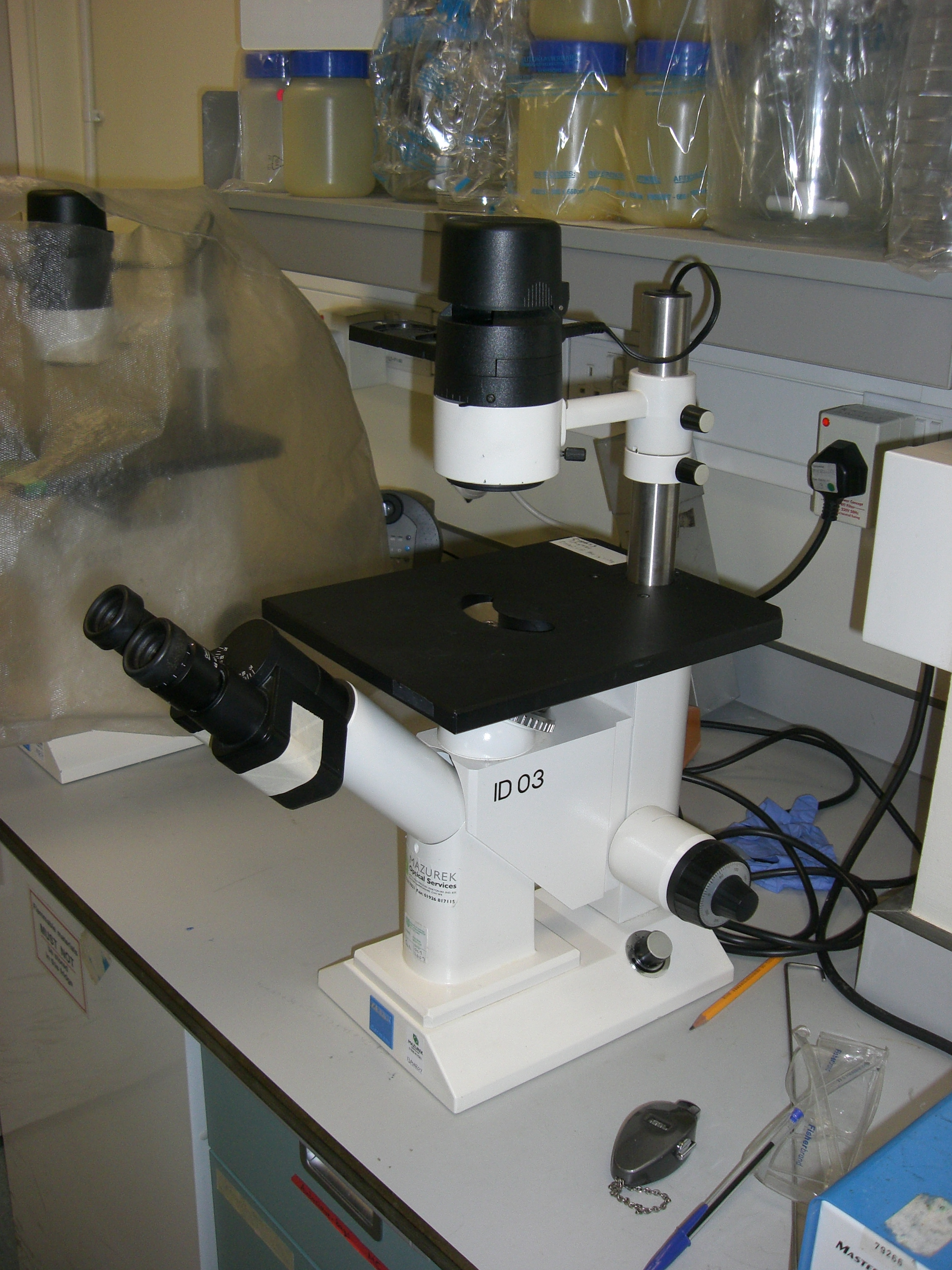
An inverted microscope for tissue culture examination.

An inverted microscope is a microscope with its light source and condenser on the top, above the stage pointing down, while the objectives and turret are below the stage pointing up. It was invented in 1850 by J. Lawrence Smith, a faculty member of Tulane University (then named the Medical College of Louisiana).

== Construction ==
The stage of an inverted microscope is usually fixed, and focus is adjusted by moving the objective lens along a vertical axis to bring it closer to or further from the specimen. The focus mechanism typically has a dual concentric knob for coarse and fine adjustment.

Depending on the size of the microscope, four to six objective lenses of different magnifications may be fitted to a rotating turret known as a nosepiece. These microscopes may also be fitted with accessories for fitting still and video cameras, fluorescence illumination, confocal scanning and many other applications.

== Biological applications ==
Inverted microscopes are useful for observing living cells or organisms at the bottom of a large container (e.g., a tissue culture flask) under more natural conditions than on a glass slide, as is the case with a conventional microscope. An inverted microscope is also used for visualisation of the Mycobacterium tuberculosis bacteria in the technique called Microscopic Observation Drug Susceptibility assay (MODS).

== Micromanipulation ==
Inverted microscopes are used in micromanipulation applications where space above the specimen is required for manipulator mechanisms and the microtools they hold, and in metallurgical applications where polished samples can be placed on top of the stage and viewed from underneath using reflecting objectives.
