= Friedrich Adolph Nobert =

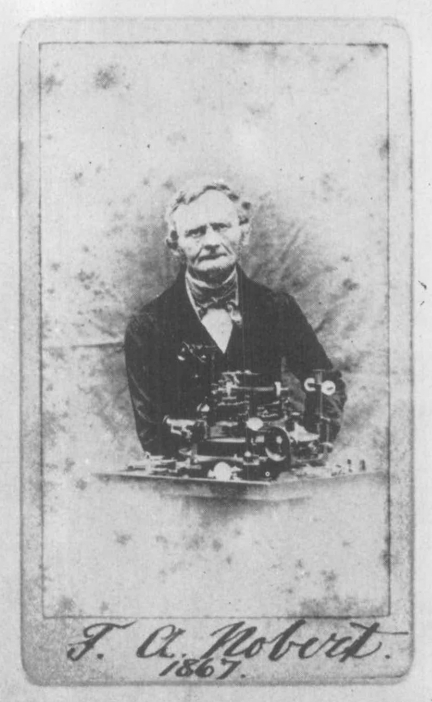
Nobert's carte-de-visite, 1867 with his dividing machine

Friedrich Adolph Nobert (17 January 1806 – 21 February 1881) was a Pomeranian microscope designer who pioneered the use of diamond-ruled microscope slide gratings for accurate measurements. This extended further to diffraction gratings for use in spectrometers and the measurement of the solar spectrum by Anders Jonas Ångström which was published in 1868 made use of gratings made by Nobert. The finest lines were found to be at a distance of 0.1128 μm.

== Biography ==
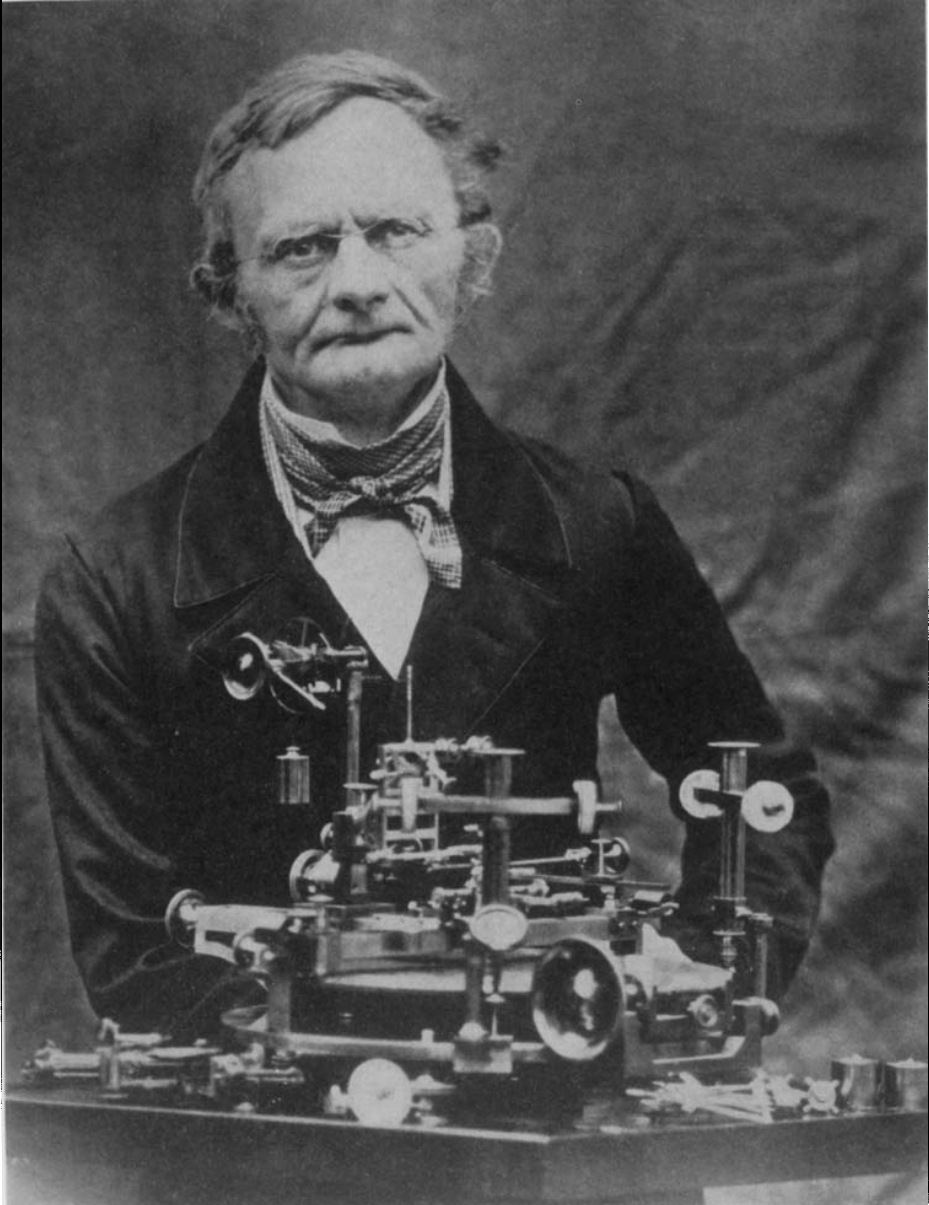
Nobert in 1867

Nobert was born in Barth on the Baltic coast, where his father Johann Friedrich Nobert was a clockmaker. He was known as Fritz, and being the eldest son, he was expected to receive a technical education and continue as a clockmaker. A younger brother studied theology and became a pastor. He found his schooling insufficient for the clockmaking work and tried to study arithmetic, geometry and trigonometry on his own. He made a watch that could measure seconds, and corrected for temperature and sent it for an exhibition in Berlin in 1827. This was examined by astronomer Johann Franz Encke who wrote to Nobert and encouraged him to check its accuracy with astronomical measurements. This required a telescope and not able to purchase one, he began to construct one on his own. In 1829 he measure several star positions using a 2 foot quadrant and was able to tell that the accuracy of his chronometer was close to those made by Breguet in Paris and Kessels in Altona. He then applied for a bursary to support his education and received 300 Thalers to join the Technical Institute in Berlin from October 1833 after which he would receive the post of technician at the University of Greifswald. Nobert maintained a diary of his studies and it included lessons in astronomy and the circle-dividing engine. Nobert was appointed to Universitatsmechaniker at Greifswald in 1835, and married the same year. One of his first works was in determining the resolution of a microscope. He began to develop methods to create fine ruling on glass. Nobert's ultra-fine micrometric standards created by Nobert began in 1840 with ten lines cut between a specific distance which then extended to 20 division in 1851 and thirty in 1855. These test gratings were sold along with microscopes or separately for about 5 Thalers in 1846. Nobert also made microscopes, although he made them alone and took as long as a year to deliver one. These had a micrometer stage holding the grating measurement slide and a mechanism for slow and controlled movement. After the death of his father, Nobert returned to Barth in 1846 and worked there until his death.
