= Quantitative phase-contrast microscopy =

Quantitative phase contrast microscope
- Acronym: QPCM, QPM, QPI
- Other names: Phase microscope, Quantitative phase microscopy, Quantitative phase imaging
- Uses: Microscopic observation and quantification of unstained biological material
- Related items: Phase contrast microscopy, Differential interference contrast microscopy, Hoffman modulation contrast microscopy

Quantitative phase contrast microscopy or quantitative phase imaging are the collective names for a group of microscopy methods that quantify the phase shift that occurs when light waves pass through a more optically dense object.

Translucent objects, like a living human cell, absorb and scatter small amounts of light. This makes translucent objects much easier to observe in ordinary light microscopes. Such objects do, however, induce a phase shift that can be observed using a phase contrast microscope. Conventional phase contrast microscopy and related methods, such as differential interference contrast microscopy, visualize phase shifts by transforming phase shift gradients into intensity variations. These intensity variations are mixed with other intensity variations, making it difficult to extract quantitative information.

Quantitative phase contrast methods are distinguished from conventional phase contrast methods in that they create a second so-called phase shift image or phase image, independent of the intensity (bright field) image. Phase unwrapping methods are generally applied to the phase shift image to give absolute phase shift values in each pixel, as exemplified by Figure 1.

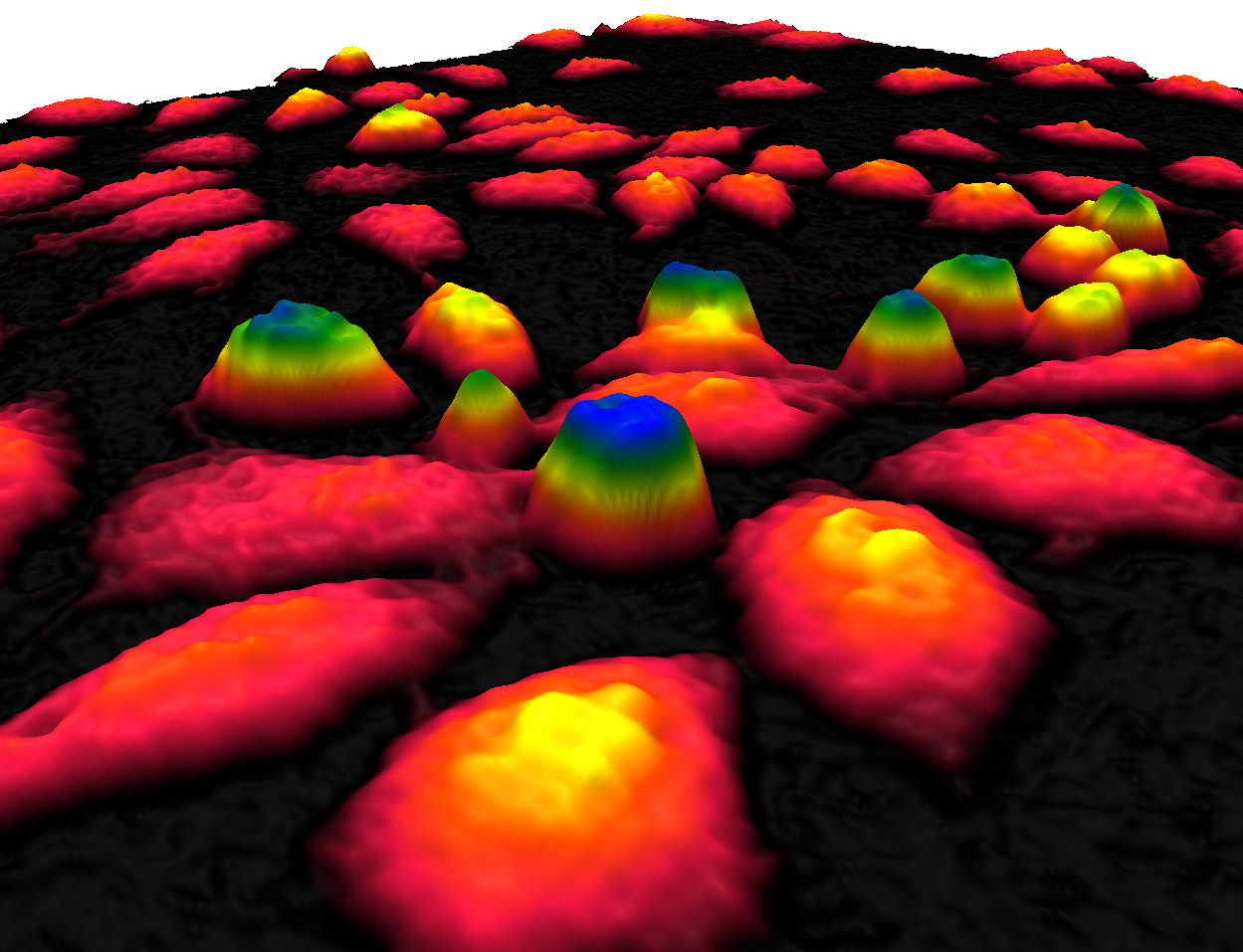
Figure 1: In this phase shift image of cells in culture, the height and color of an image point correspond to the measured phase shift. The phase shift induced by an object in an image point depends only on the object thickness and the relative refractive index of the object in the image point. The volume of an object can therefore be determined from a phase shift image when the difference in refractive index between the object and the surrounding media is known.

The principal methods for measuring and visualizing phase shifts include ptychography and various types of holographic microscopy methods such as digital holographic microscopy, holographic interference microscopy and digital in-line holographic microscopy. Common to these methods is that an interference pattern (hologram) is recorded by a digital image sensor. From the recorded interference pattern, the intensity and the phase shift image is numerically created by a computer algorithm.

Quantitative phase contrast microscopy is primarily used to observe unstained living cells. Measuring the phase delay images of biological cells provides quantitative information about the morphology and drymass of individual cells. These features can be analyzed with image analysis software, which has led to the development of non-invasive live cell imaging and automated cell culture analysis systems based on quantitative phase contrast microscopy.

== See also ==
- Cytometry
- Digital holographic microscopy
- Holographic interference microscopy
- Live cell imaging
- Phase-contrast microscopy
- Ptychography
- Time stretch quantitative phase imaging
