= Phase-contrast microscopy =

Optical microscopy technique

Phase-contrast microscope
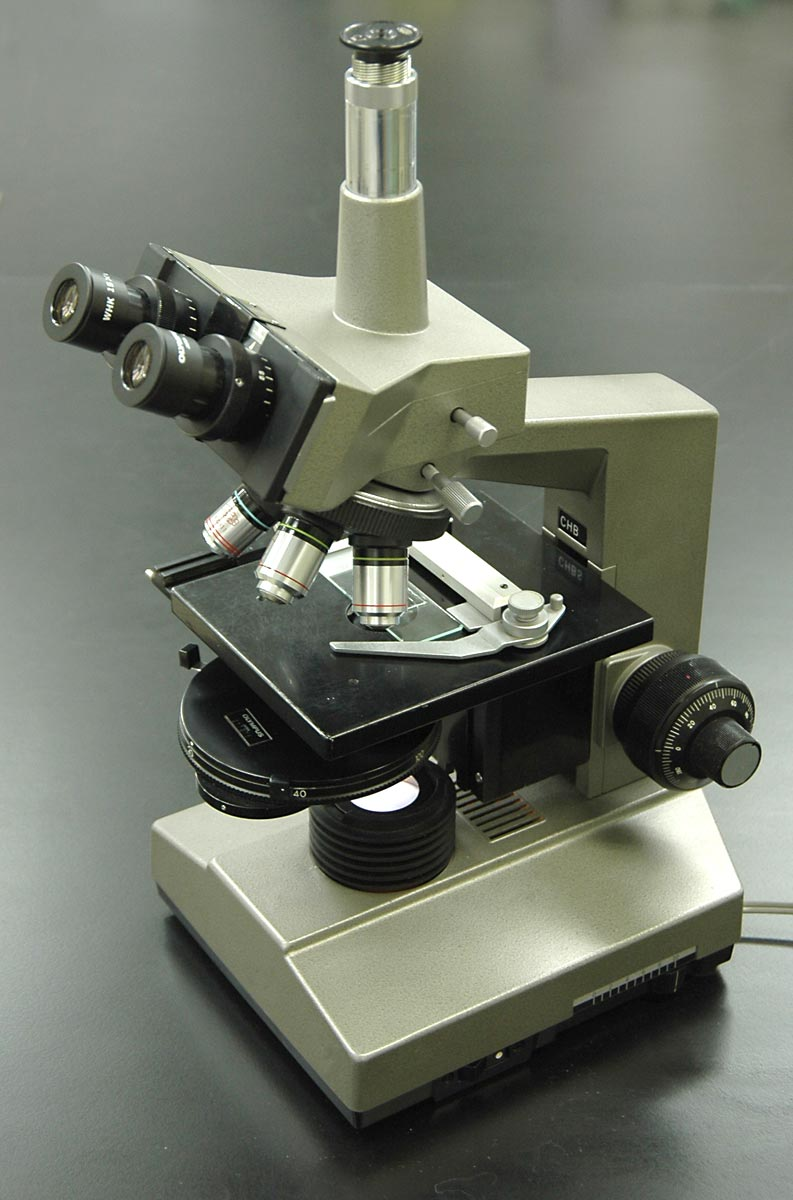
- A phase-contrast microscope
- Uses: Microscopic observation of unstained biological material
- Inventor: Frits Zernike
- Manufacturer: Leica, Zeiss, Nikon, Olympus and others
- Model: kgt
- Related items: Differential interference contrast microscopy, Hoffman modulation-contrast microscopy, Quantitative phase-contrast microscopy

Phase-contrast microscopy (PCM) is an optical microscopy technique that converts phase shifts in light passing through a transparent specimen to brightness changes in the image. Phase shifts themselves are invisible, but become visible when shown as brightness variations.

When light waves travel through a medium other than a vacuum, interaction with the medium causes the wave amplitude and phase to change in a manner dependent on properties of the medium. Changes in amplitude (brightness) arise from the scattering and absorption of light, which is often wavelength-dependent and may give rise to colors. Photographic equipment and the human eye are only sensitive to amplitude variations. Without special arrangements, phase changes are therefore invisible. Yet, phase changes often convey important information.

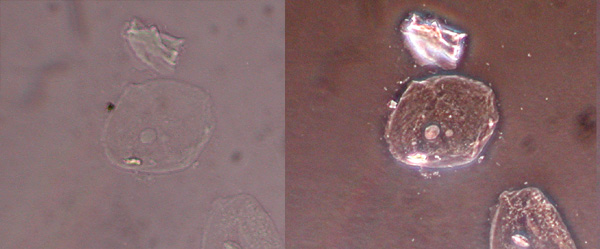
The same cells imaged with traditional bright-field microscopy (left), and with phase-contrast microscopy (right)

Phase-contrast microscopy is particularly important in biology. It reveals many cellular structures that are invisible with a bright-field microscope, as exemplified in the figure. These structures were made visible to earlier microscopists by staining, but this required additional preparation and death of the cells. The phase-contrast microscope made it possible for biologists to study living cells and how they proliferate through cell division. It is one of the few methods available to quantify cellular structure and components without using fluorescence. After its invention in the early 1930s, phase-contrast microscopy proved to be such an advancement in microscopy that its inventor Frits Zernike was awarded the Nobel Prize in Physics in 1953. The woman who manufactured this microscope, Caroline Bleeker, often remains uncredited.

== Working principle ==
Dark field and phase contrast microscopies operating principle

The basic principle to make phase changes visible in phase-contrast microscopy is to separate the illuminating (background) light from the specimen-scattered light (which makes up the foreground details) and to manipulate these differently.

The ring-shaped illuminating light (depicted in green in figure) that passes the condenser annulus is focused on the specimen by the condenser. Some of the illuminating light is scattered by the specimen (yellow). The remaining light is unaffected by the specimen and forms the background light (red). When observing an unstained biological specimen, the scattered light is weak and typically phase-shifted by −90° (due to both the typical thickness of specimens and the refractive index difference between biological tissue and the surrounding medium) relative to the background light. This leads to the foreground (blue vector in accompanying figure) and background (red vector) having nearly the same intensity, resulting in low image contrast.

In a phase-contrast microscope, image contrast is increased in two ways: by generating constructive interference between scattered and background light rays in regions of the field of view that contain the specimen, and by reducing the amount of background light that reaches the image plane. First, the background light is phase-shifted by −90° by passing it through a phase-shift ring, which eliminates the phase difference between the background and the scattered light rays.

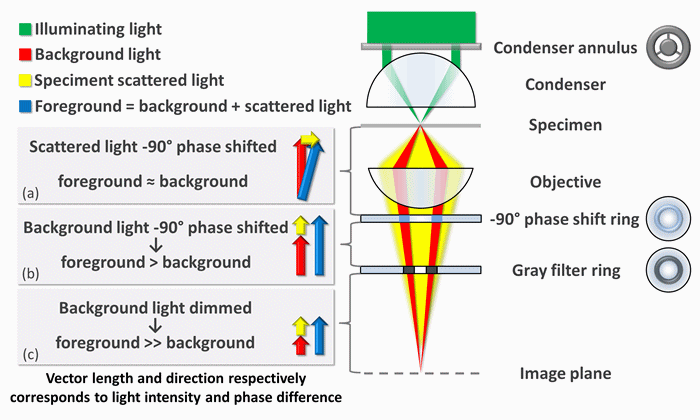

When the light is then focused on the image plane (where a camera or eyepiece is placed), this phase shift causes background and scattered light rays originating from regions of the field of view that contain the sample (i.e., the foreground) to constructively interfere, resulting in an increase in the brightness of these areas compared to regions that do not contain the sample. Finally, the background is dimmed ~70-90% by a neutral density filter ring; this method maximizes the amount of scattered light generated by the illumination light, while minimizing the amount of illumination light that reaches the image plane. Some of the scattered light that illuminates the entire surface of the filter will be phase-shifted and dimmed by the rings, but to a much lesser extent than the background light, which only illuminates the phase-shift and neutral density filter rings.

The above describes negative phase contrast. In its positive form, the background light is instead phase-shifted by +90°. The background light will thus be 180° out of phase relative to the scattered light. The scattered light will then be subtracted from the background light to form an image with a darker foreground and a lighter background, as shown in the first figure.

== Related methods ==
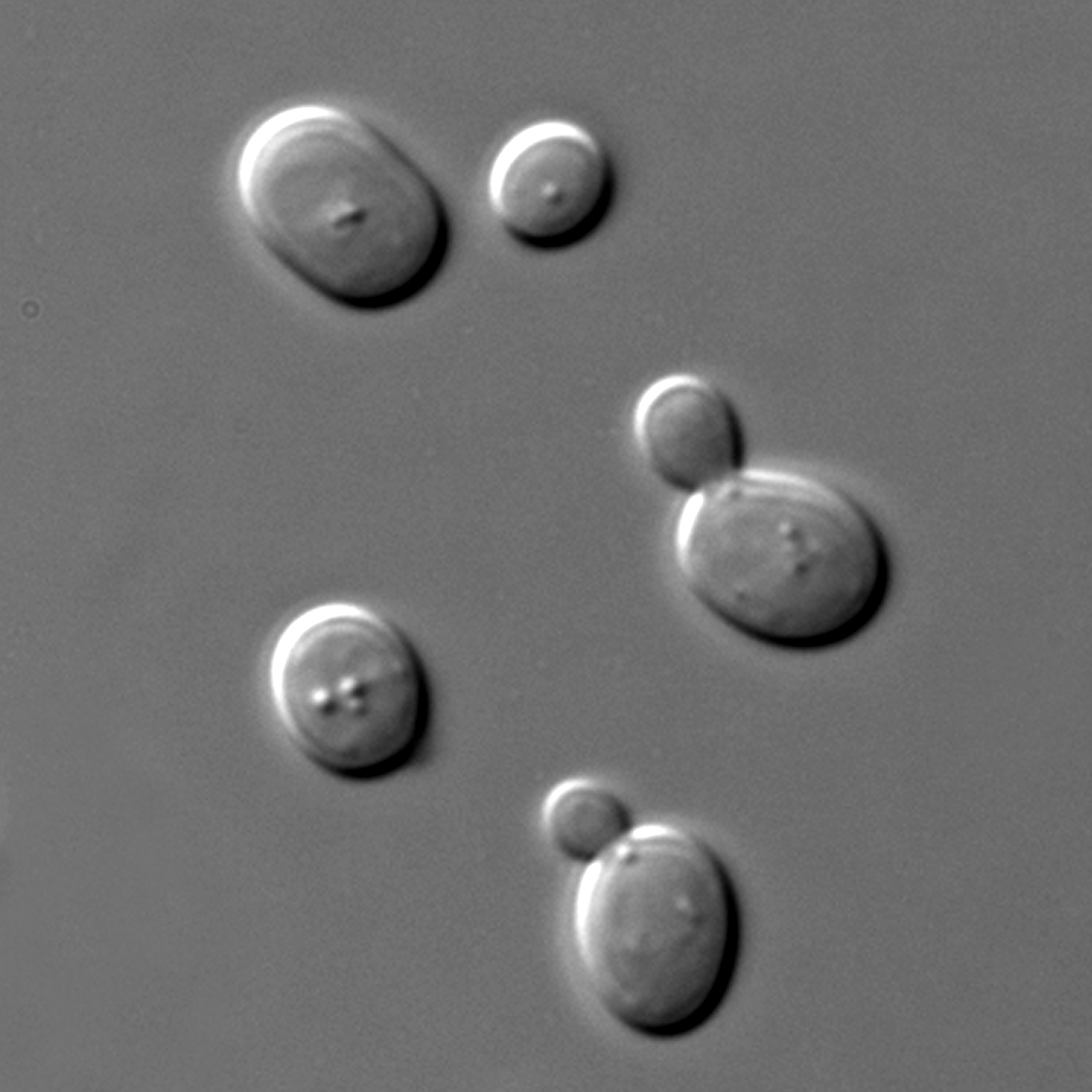
S. cerevisiae cells imaged by DIC microscopy

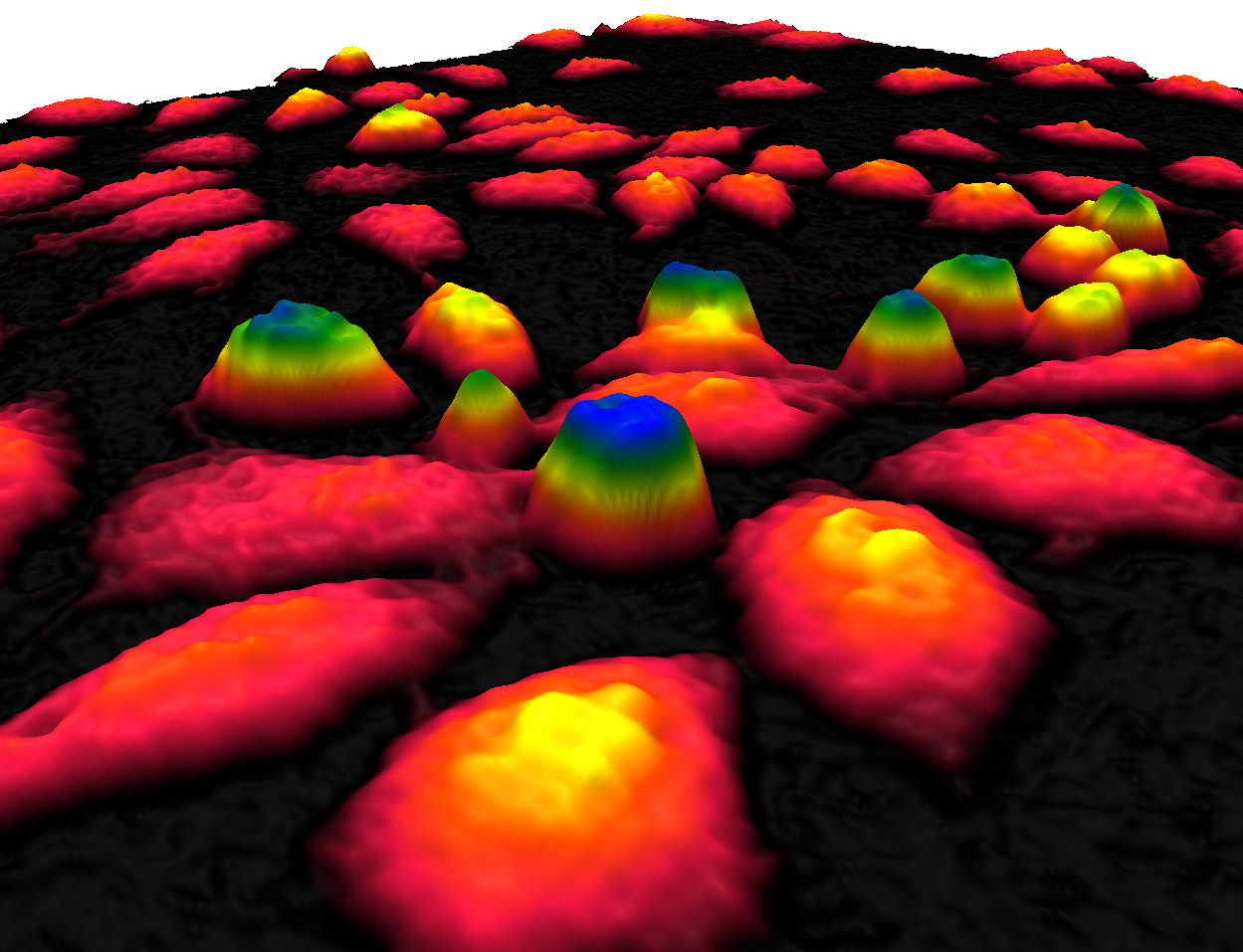
A quantitative phase-contrast microscopy image of cells in culture. The height and color of an image point correspond to the optical thickness, which only depends on the object's thickness and the relative refractive index. The volume of an object can thus be determined when the difference in refractive index between the object and the surrounding media is known.

The success of the phase-contrast microscope has led to a number of subsequent phase-imaging methods. In 1952, Georges Nomarski patented what is today known as differential interference contrast (DIC) microscopy. It enhances contrast by creating artificial shadows, as if the object is illuminated from the side. But DIC microscopy is unsuitable when the object or its container alter polarization. With the growing use of polarizing plastic containers in cell biology, DIC microscopy is increasingly replaced by Hoffman modulation contrast microscopy, invented by Robert Hoffman in 1975.

Traditional phase-contrast methods enhance contrast optically, blending brightness and phase information in a single image. Since the introduction of the digital camera in the mid-1990s, several new digital phase-imaging methods have been developed, collectively known as quantitative phase-contrast microscopy. These methods digitally create two separate images, an ordinary bright-field image and a so-called phase-shift image. In each image point, the phase-shift image displays the quantified phase shift induced by the object, which is proportional to the optical thickness of the object. In this way measurement of the associated optical field can remedy the halo artifacts associated with conventional phase contrast by solving an optical inverse problem to computationally reconstruct the scattering potential of the object.

== See also ==
- Live cell imaging
- Phase-contrast imaging
- Phase-contrast X-ray imaging
