= Hoffman modulation contrast microscopy =

Optical microscopy technique

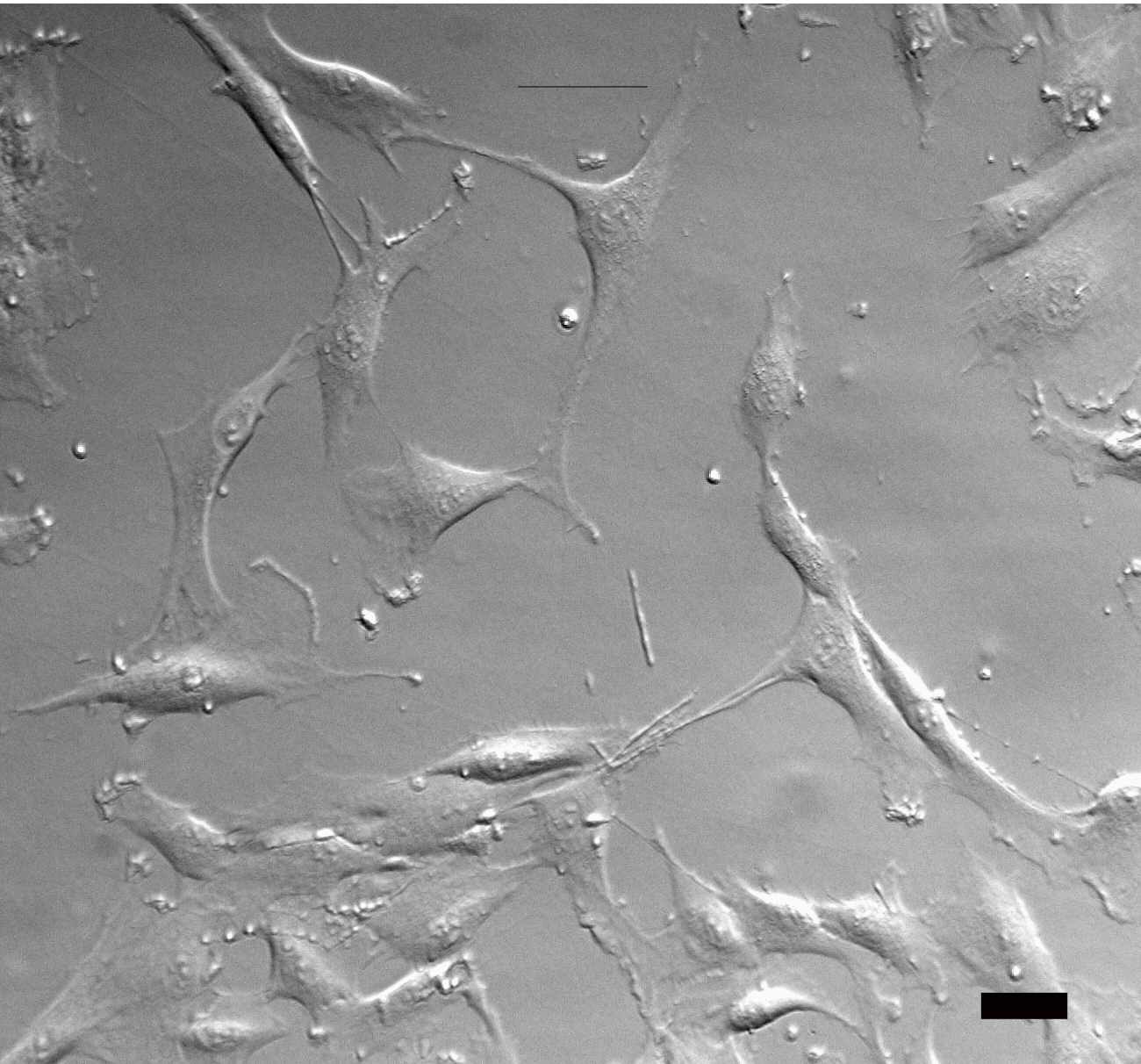
Human meniscus cells via Hoffman modulation contrast. Scale bar=10 μm.

Hoffman modulation contrast microscopy (HMC microscopy) is an optical microscopy technique for enhancing the contrast in unstained biological specimens. The technique was invented by Robert Hoffman in 1975. Like differential interference contrast microscopy (DIC microscopy), contrast is increased by using components in the light path which convert phase gradients in the specimen into differences in light intensity that are rendered in an image that appears three-dimensional. The 3D appearance may be misleading, as a feature which appears to cast a shadow may not necessarily have a distinct physical geometry corresponding to the shadow. The technique is particularly suitable for optical sectioning at lower magnifications.

An example of the use of HMC illumination is in in-vitro fertilisation, where under brightfield illumination the near-transparent oocyte is hard to see clearly.

HMC systems typically consist of a condenser with a slit aperture, an objective with a slit aperture, and a polariser which is fitted between the condenser and the illumination source and is used to control the degree of contrast. The principle of HMC is used by a number of microscope manufacturers who have introduced their own variants of the technique.
