= Comité Colbert =

French association (founded 1954)

Comité Colbert, headquartered at 29 Boulevard de Courcelles, 75008 Paris, France, is an association "to promote the concept of luxury."

In 2026, the organization gathered 65 members for “Hidden Treasures, 250 Years of Franco-American Luxury Stories,” an exhibition at New York City's The Shed which focused on the cultural exchange between France and America via objects created by French luxury houses.

== History and operations ==
It was founded in 1954 by Jean-Jacques Guerlain, son of French perfumer Jacques Guerlain. The association has more than one hundred members, most of which are French companies in the luxury-goods industry.

=== Métiers or trade sectors ===
The association is divided into thirteen métiers or trade sectors. The sectors are:

- automobile
- crystal
- decoration
- faience and porcelain
- fragrance and cosmetic
- gastronomie
- gold and precious materials
- haute couture / fashion
- hospitality
- leather goods
- publishing
- silver and bronze
- wine and spirits

The association adopted its first automobile brand (Bugatti) in July 2015.

=== Members ===
Members include:

==== A–M ====
- Baccarat
- Berluti
- Bernardaud
- Bonpoint
- Boucheron
- Breguet
- Bugatti
- Bussière
- Caron
- Cartier
- Céline
- Champagne Bollinger
- Champagne Charles Heidsieck
- Chanel
- Parfums Chanel
- Château Cheval Blanc
- Château Lafite Rothschild
- Château d'Yquem
- Chloé
- Christian Dior
- Parfums Christian Dior
- Christian Liaigre
- Christofle
- D. Porthault
- D. Wandrille
- Dalloyau
- Éditions Diane de Selliers
- Delisle
- Ercuis
- Eres
- Dr. Irena Eris
- Faïenceries de Gien
- Gucci
- Flammarion Beaux livres
- Éditions de parfums Frédéric Malle
- George V
- Givenchy
- Parfums Givenchy
- Guerlain
- Hédiard
- Hermès
- Parfums Hermès
- Le Bristol
- Hôtel du Palais
- Hôtel Ritz Paris
- Jean Patou
- Jeanne Lanvin
- John Lobb Bootmaker
- Krug
- Lacoste
- Lancôme
- Le Meurice
- Lenôtre
- Leonard
- Longchamp
- Lorenz Bäumer Joaillier
- Louis Vuitton
- La Maison du Chocolat
- Maison Francis Kurkdjian
- Martell
- Mellerio dits Meller

==== N–Z ====
- Oustau de Baumanière
- Perrier-Jouët
- Pierre Balmain
- Pierre Frey
- Pierre Hermé
- Pierre Hardy
- Plaza Athénée
- Potel et Chabot
- Jean Puiforcat
- Orient-Express
- Rémy Martin
- Robert Haviland et C. Parlon
- Rochas
- Saint-Louis
- ST Dupont
- Taillevent
- Van Cleef & Arpels
- Veuve Clicquot Ponsardin
- Yves Delorme
- Yves Saint Laurent
- Yves Saint Laurent Beauté Perfums

== See also ==
- Altagamma (an association of Italian luxury brands)
- Henokiens (an international association of family-owned companies that have existed for 200 years or more)
- Made in France
