= Petrographic microscope =

Optical microscope

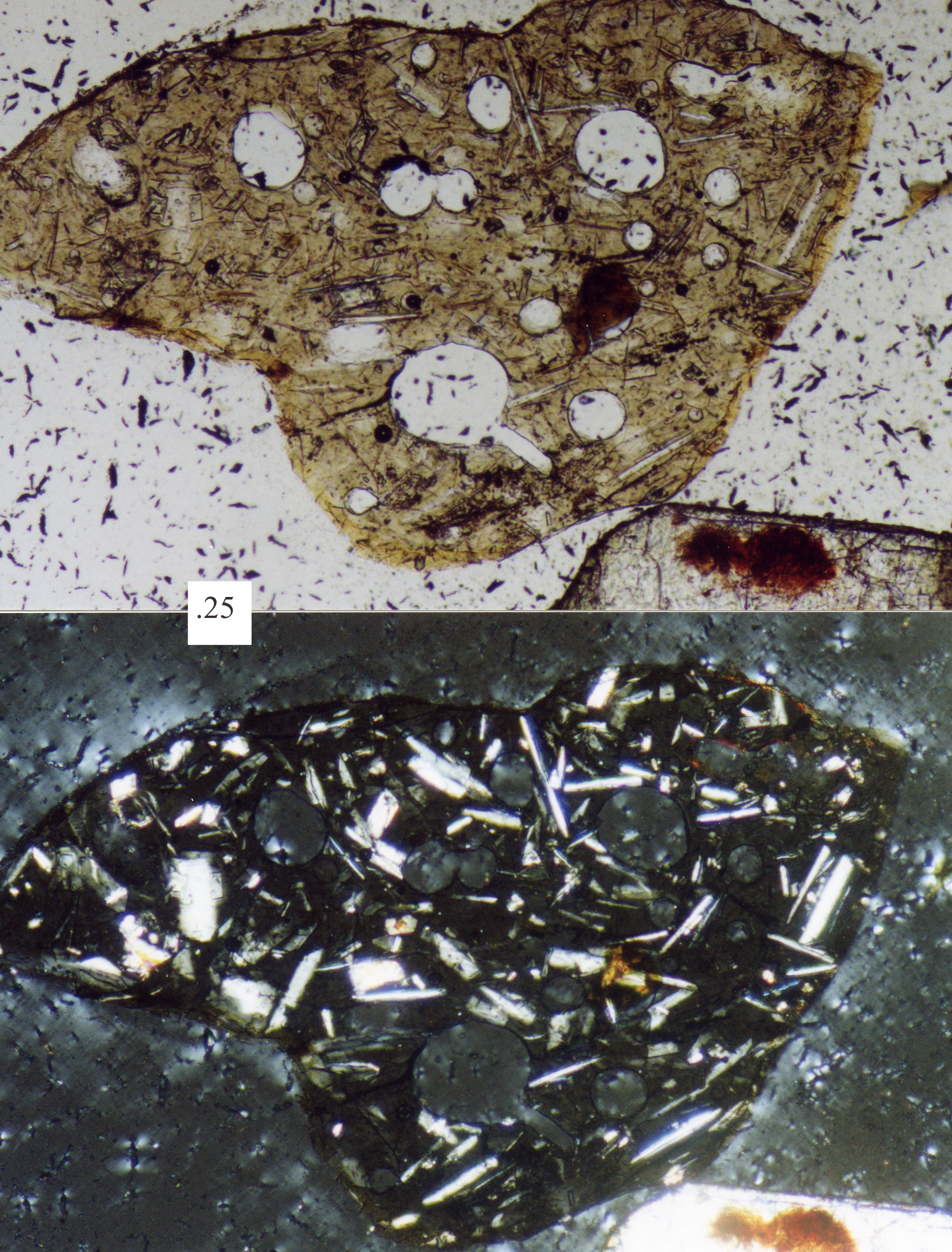
Plain light with the first filter (above), crossed-polarized light with both filters (below) in a volcanic lithic fragment (sand grain). Scale box in millimeters.

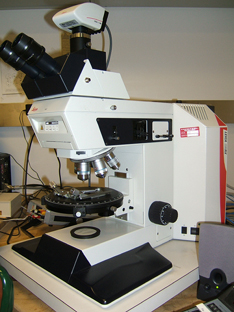
Leica DMRX incident light microscope with mechanical stage and Swift F automated point counter for analysis of organic composition of coal and rock samples

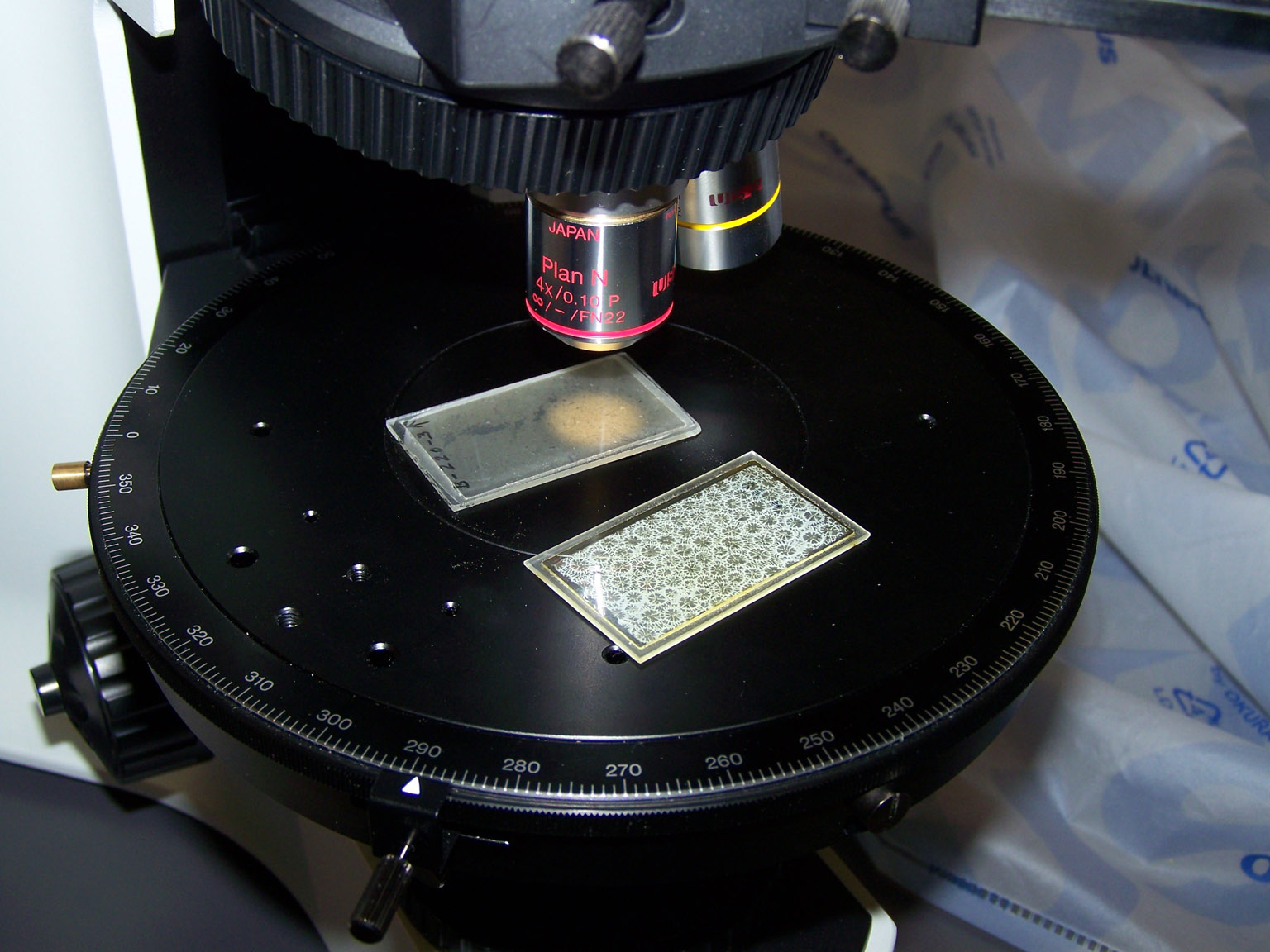
Thin sections under a microscope.

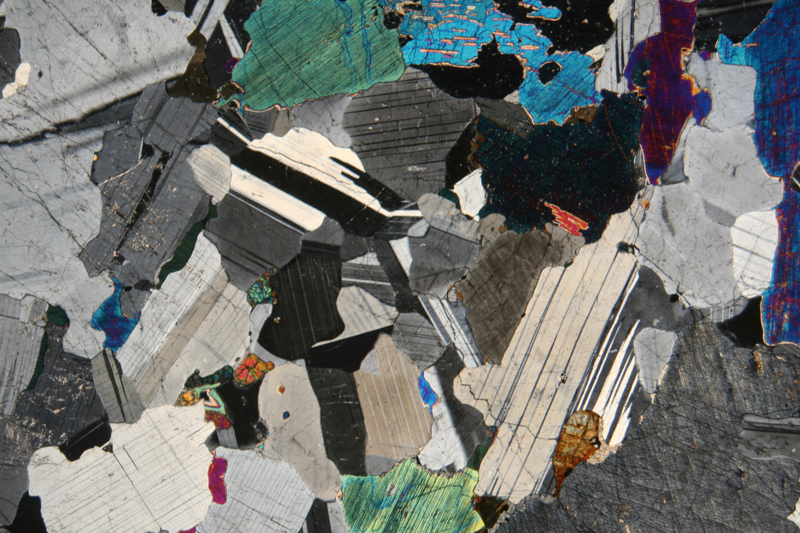
Photomicrograph of a thin section of gabbro in cross-polarized light

A petrographic microscope is a type of optical microscope used to identify rocks and minerals in thin sections. The microscope is used in optical mineralogy and petrography, a branch of petrology which focuses on detailed descriptions of rocks. The method includes aspects of polarized light microscopy (PLM).

== Description ==
Depending on the grade of observation required, petrographic microscopes are derived from conventional brightfield microscopes of similar basic capabilities by:

- Adding a Nicol prism polarizer filter to the light path beneath the sample slide
- Replacing the normal stage with a circular rotating stage (typically graduated with vernier scales for reading orientations to better than 1 degree of arc)
- Adding a second rotatable and removable Nicol prism filter, called the analyzer, to the light path between objective and eyepiece
- Adding a phase telescope, also known as a Bertrand lens, which allows the viewer to see conoscopic interference patterns
- Adding a slot for insertion of wave plates

Petrographic microscopes are constructed with optical parts that do not add unwanted polarizing effects due to strained glass, or polarization by reflection in prisms and mirrors. These special parts add to the cost and complexity of the microscope. However, a "simple polarizing" microscope is easily made by adding inexpensive polarizing filters to a standard biological microscope, often with one in a filter holder beneath the condenser, and a second inserted beneath the head or eyepiece. These can be sufficient for many non-quantitative purposes.

The two Nicol prisms (occasionally referred to as nicols) of the petrographic microscope have their polarizing planes oriented perpendicular to one another. When only an isotropic material such as air, water, or glass exists between the filters, all light is blocked, but most crystalline materials and minerals change the polarizing light directions, allowing some of the altered light to pass through the analyzer to the viewer. Using one polarizer makes it possible to view the slide in plane polarized light; using two allows for analysis under cross polarized light. A particular light pattern on the upper lens surface of the objectives is created as a conoscopic interference pattern (or interference figure) characteristic of uniaxial and biaxial minerals, and produced with convergent polarized light. To observe the interference figure, true petrographic microscopes usually include an accessory called a Bertrand lens, which focuses and enlarges the figure. It is also possible to remove an eyepiece lens to make a direct observation of the objective lens surface.

In addition to modifications of the microscope's optical system, petrographic microscopes allow for the insertion of specially-cut oriented filters of biaxial minerals (the quartz wedge, quarter-wave mica plate and half-wave mica plate), into the optical train between the polarizers to identify positive and negative birefringence, and in extreme cases, the mineral order when needed.

== History ==
As early as 1808, the French physicist Étienne Louis Malus discovered the refraction and polarization of light. William Nicol invented a prism for polarization in 1829, which was an indispensable part of the polarizing microscope for over 100 years. Later the Nicol prisms were replaced by cheaper polarizing filters.

The first complete polarizing microscope was built by Giovanni Battista Amici in 1830.

Rudolf Fuess built the first polarization microscope specifically for petrographic purposes in 1875. This was described by Harry Rosenbusch in the yearbook for mineralogy.
