= Bright-field microscopy =

Optical microscopy illumination technique

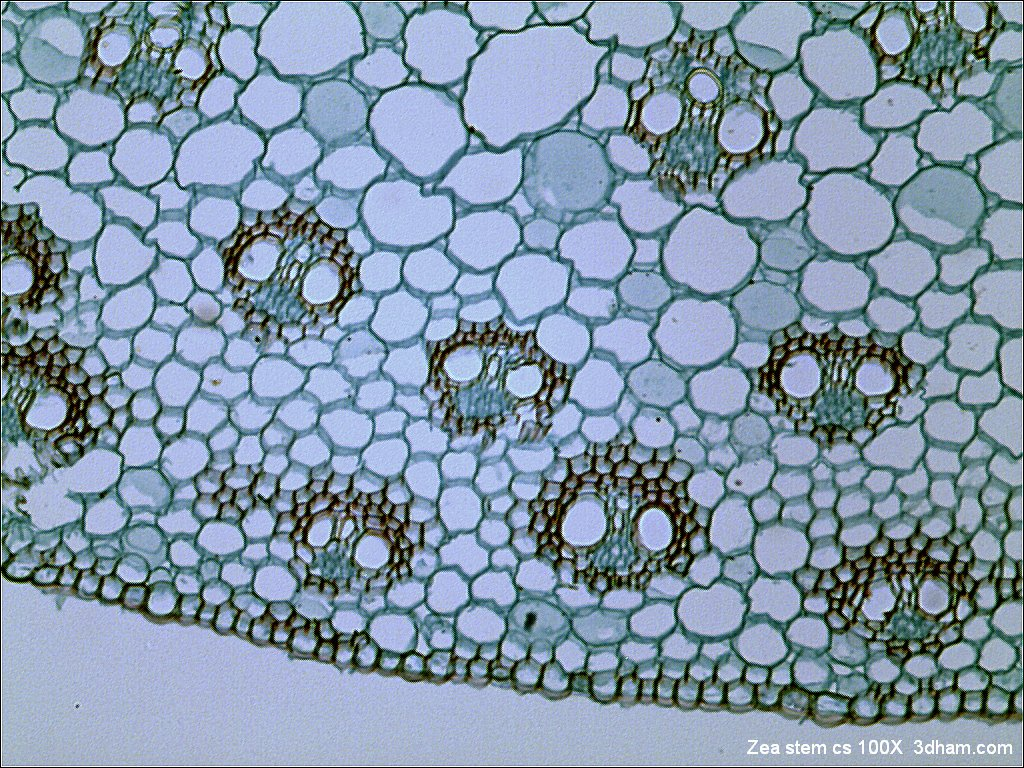
An example bright-field micrograph. This image shows a cross-section of the vascular tissue in a plant stem.

Bright-field microscopy (BF) is the simplest of all the optical microscopy illumination techniques. Sample illumination is transmitted (i.e., illuminated from below and observed from above) white light, and contrast in the image is caused by attenuation of the transmitted light in dense areas of the sample. Bright-field microscopy is the simplest of a range of techniques used for illumination of samples in light microscopes, and its simplicity makes it a popular technique. The typical appearance of a bright-field microscopy image is a dark sample on a bright background, hence the name.

== History of microscopy ==
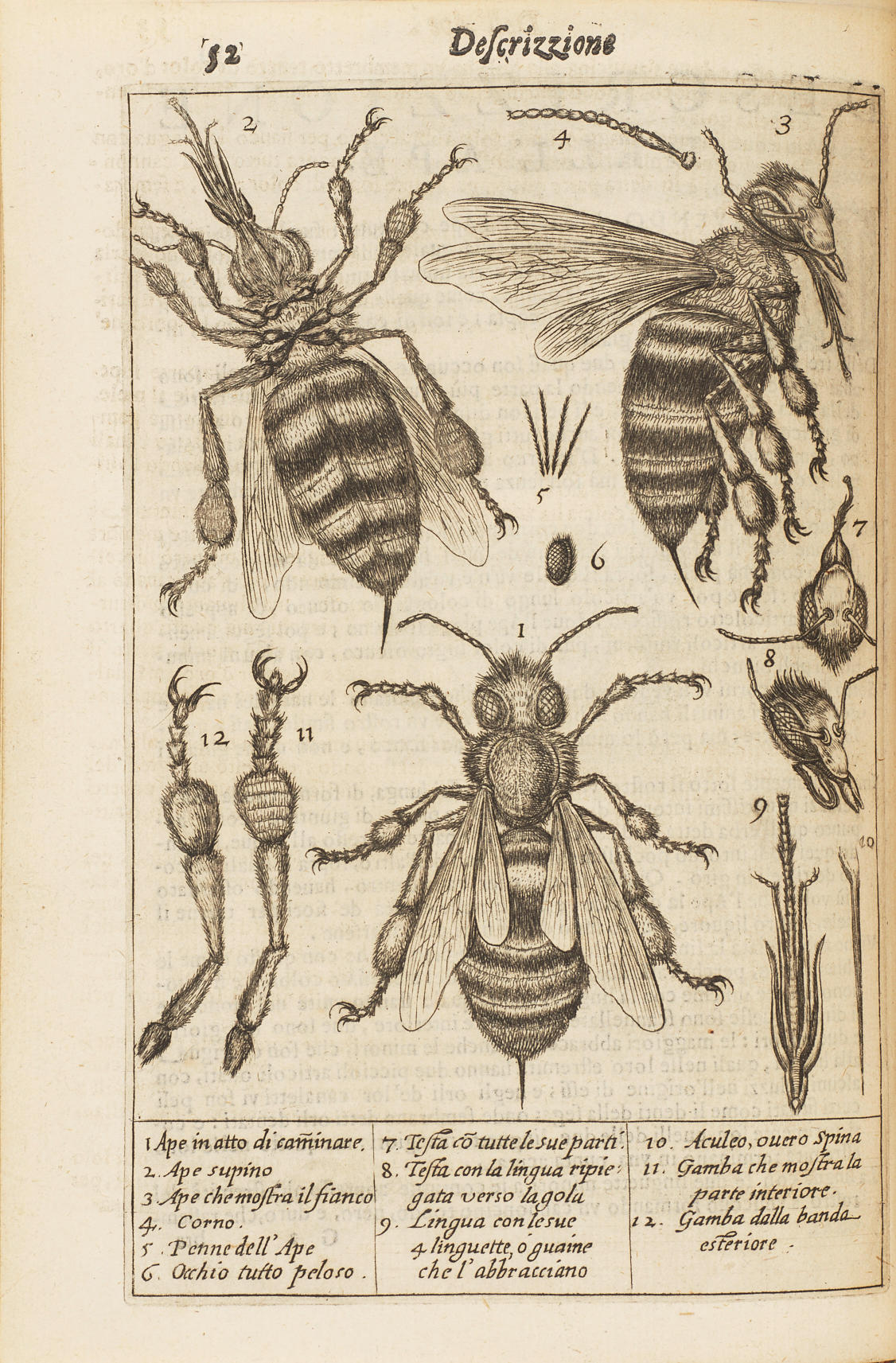
The oldest published image known to have been made with a microscope: bees by Francesco Stelluti, 1630

Compound microscopes first appeared in Europe around 1620. The actual inventor of the compound microscope is unknown although many claims have been made over the years. These include a dubious claim that Dutch spectacle-maker Zacharias Janssen invented the compound microscope and the telescope as early as 1590. Another claim is that Janssen's competitor Hans Lippershey, who applied for the first telescope patent in 1608, also invented the compound microscope. Other historians point to the Dutch innovator Cornelis Drebbel who demonstrated a compound microscope in London around 1621.

Galileo Galilei is sometimes cited as an inventor of the compound microscope. After 1610, he found that he could close-focus his telescope to view small objects such as flies and/or could look through the wrong end in reverse to magnify small objects. The only drawback was that his telescope had to be extended out to six feet to view objects that close.

Christiaan Huygens, another Dutchman, developed a simple two-lens ocular system in the late 17th century that was achromatically corrected, and therefore a huge step forward in microscope development. The Huygens ocular is still being produced to this day, but suffers from a small field size and other minor disadvantages.

Antonie van Leeuwenhoek (1632–1724) is credited with bringing the microscope to the attention of biologists, even though simple magnifying lenses were already being produced in the 16th century. Van Leeuwenhoek's home-made microscopes were simple microscopes, with a single very small, yet strong lens. They were awkward to use, but enabled van Leeuwenhoek to see detailed images. It took about 150 years of optical development before the compound microscope was able to provide the same quality image as van Leeuwenhoek's simple microscopes, due to difficulties in configuring multiple lenses. In the 1850s, John Leonard Riddell, Professor of Chemistry at Tulane University, invented the first practical binocular microscope while carrying out one of the earliest and most extensive American microscopic investigations of cholera.

== Construction ==
A bright-field microscope has many important parts including; the condenser, the objective lens, the ocular lens, the diaphragm, and the aperture. Some other pieces of the microscope that are commonly known are the arm, the head, the illuminator, the base, the stage, the adjusters, and the brightness adjuster. The condenser of the microscope allows no extra light from the surroundings to interfere with the light path and condenses the light from the illuminator to make a uniform light path. The objective lens and the ocular lens work together, the ocular lens is ten times magnification and the ocular lens has different numbers by how much they can go up to, the highest being 400, the two together make up to 4,000x magnification. The aperture is a part of the diaphragm that controls the diameter of the beam passing through the sample at a time. The adjusters move the stage up and down towards the objective lens and the arm, head, and base.

=== Light path ===
The light path of a bright-field microscope is extremely simple; no additional components are required beyond the normal light-microscope setup. The light path begins at the illuminator or the light source on the base of the microscope. Often a halogen lamp is used. The light travels through the objective lens into the ocular lens, through which the image is viewed. Bright-field microscopy may use critical or Köhler illumination to illuminate the sample.

== Performance ==
Bright-field microscopes are very simple to use and can be used to view both stained and unstained specimens. The optics do not change the color of the specimen, making it easy to interpret what is observed.

Bright-field microscopy is a standard light-microscopy technique, and therefore magnification is limited by the resolving power possible with the wavelength of visible light. The practical limit to magnification with a light microscope is around 1300×. Higher magnifications are possible, but it becomes increasingly difficult to maintain image clarity as the magnification increases. Bright-field microscopes have low apparent optical resolution due to the blur of out-of-focus material;

Bright-field microscopes typically produce low contrast with most biological samples, as few absorb light to a great extent. Samples that are naturally colorless and transparent cannot be seen well, e.g. many types of mammalian cells. Staining is often required to increase contrast, which prevents use on live cells in many situations. Bright-field illumination is useful for samples that have an intrinsic color, for example mitochondria or the observation of cytoplasmic streaming in Chara cells.

Comparison of transillumination techniques used to generate contrast in a sample of tissue paper (1.559 μm/pixel)

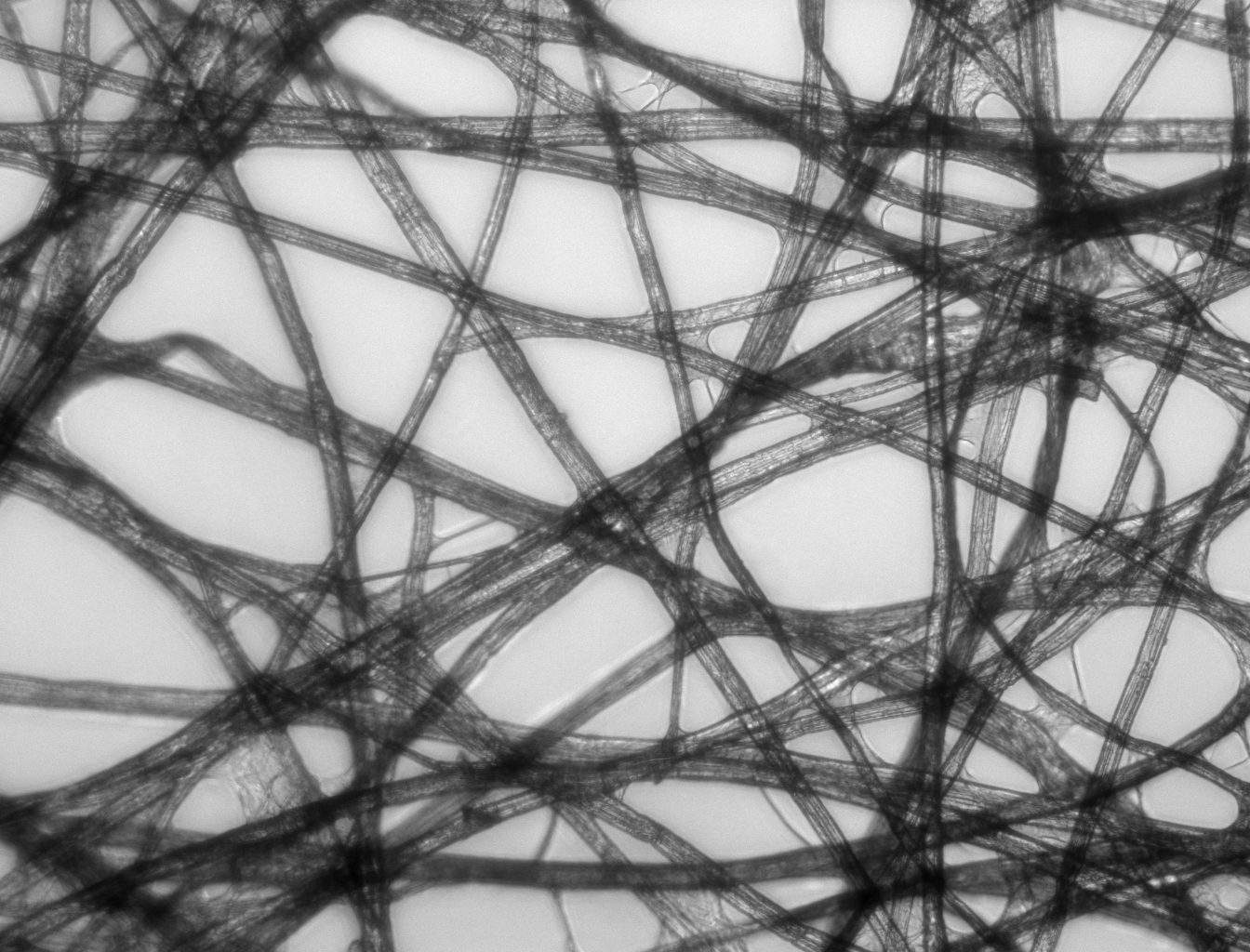
Bright-field illumination, sample contrast comes from absorbance of light in the sample

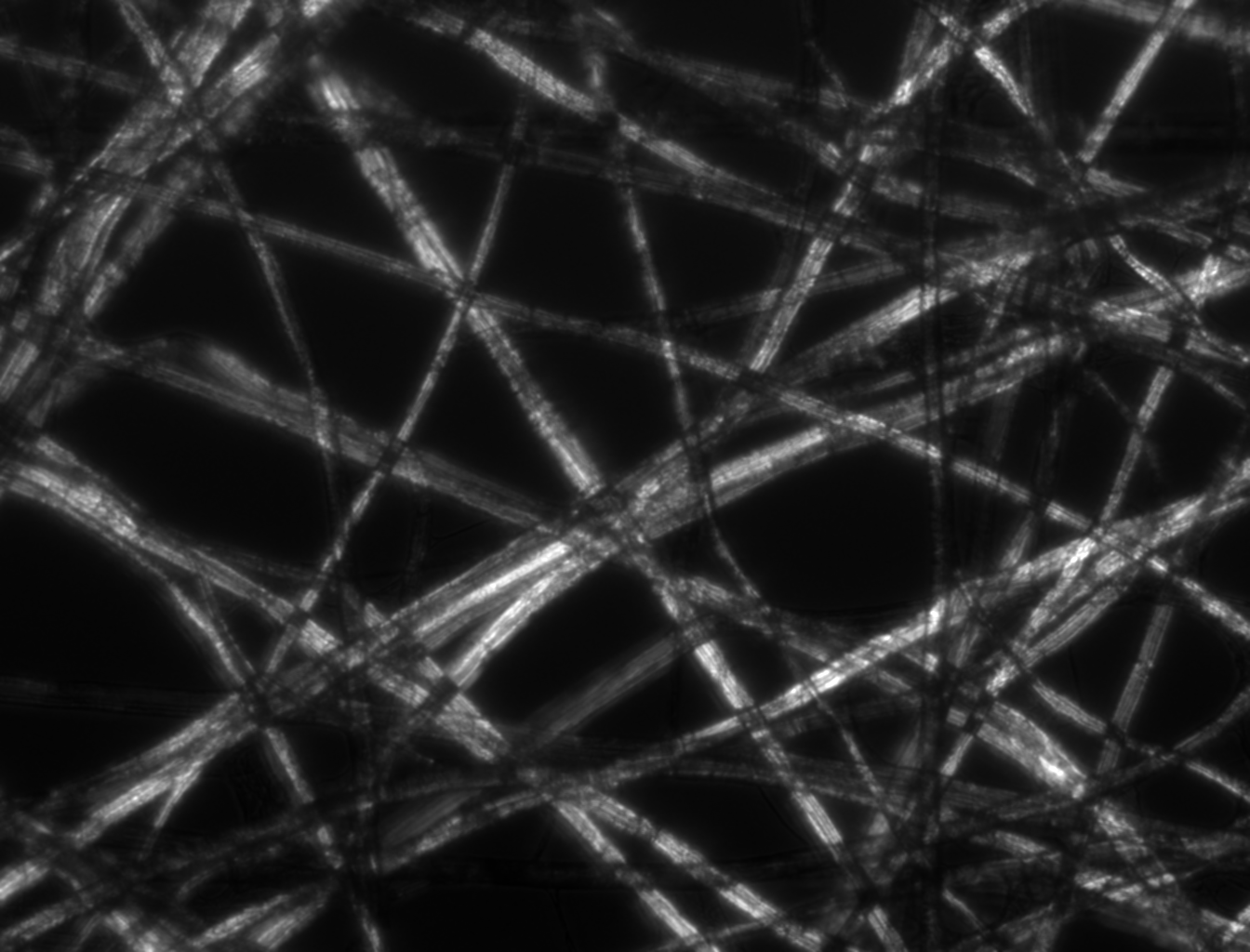
Cross-polarized light illumination, sample contrast comes from the rotation of polarized light through the sample

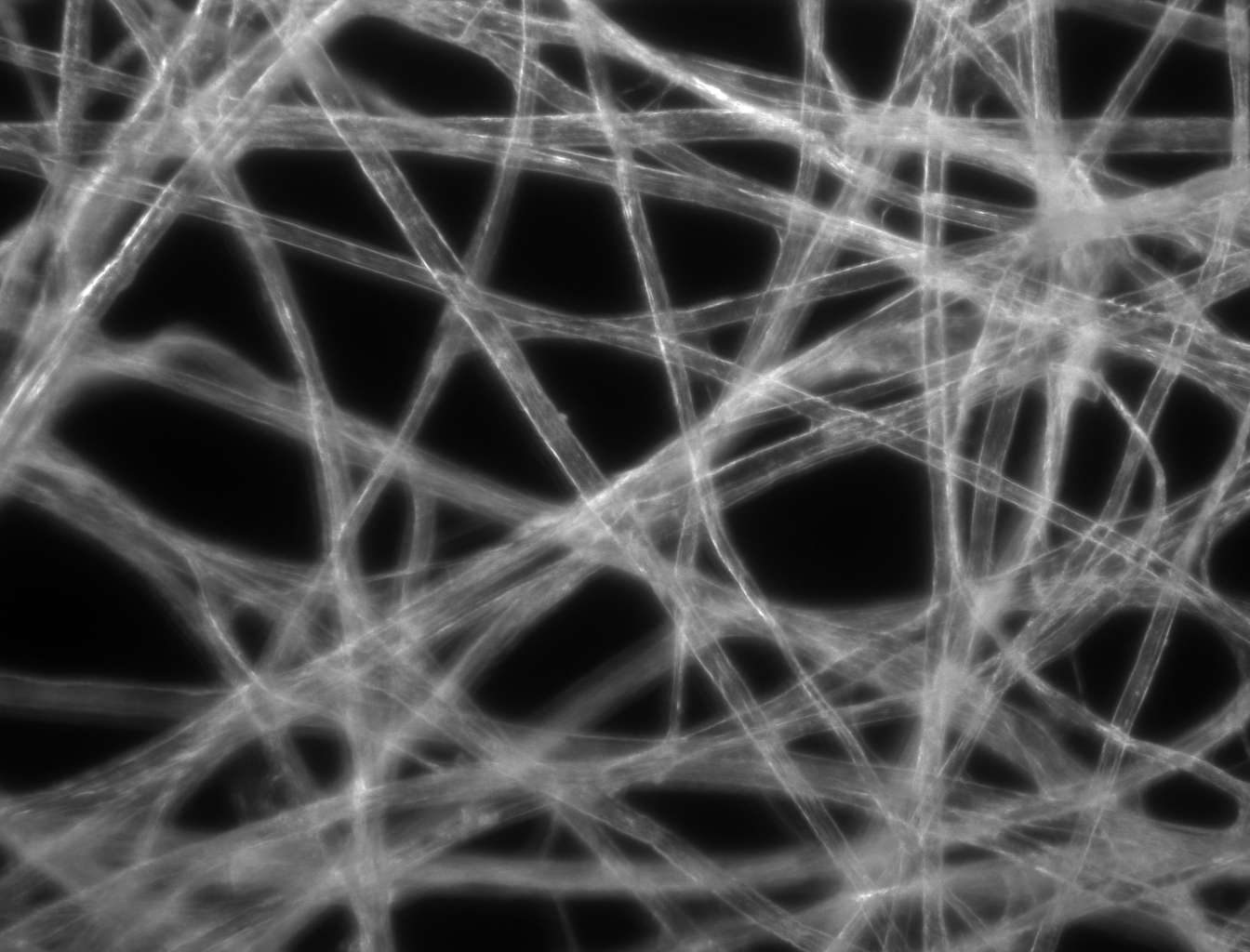
Dark-field illumination, sample contrast comes from light scattered by the sample

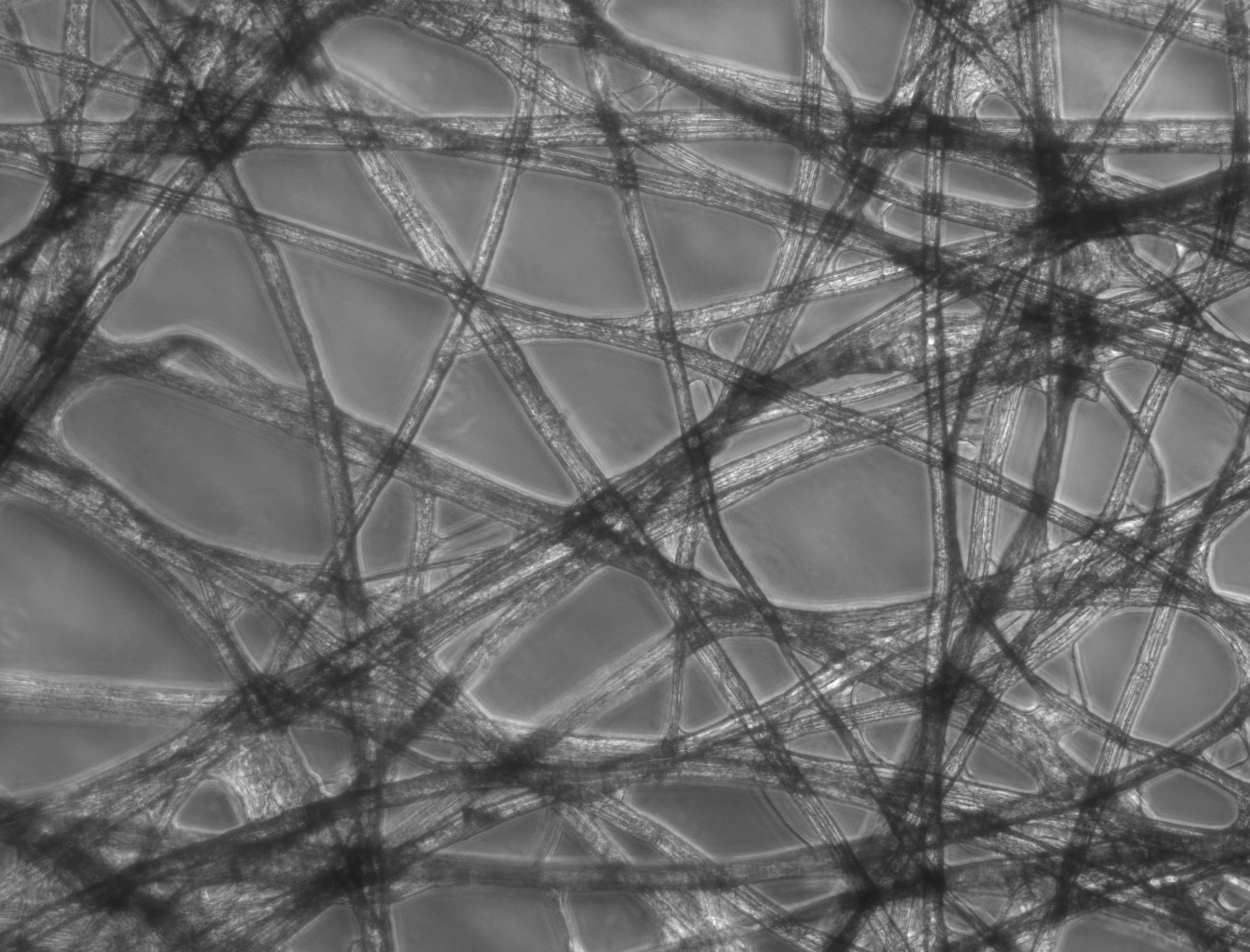
Phase-contrast illumination, sample contrast comes from interference of different path lengths of light through the sample

== Enhancements ==
- Reducing or increasing the amount of the light source by the iris diaphragm.
- Use of an oil-immersion objective lens and a special immersion oil placed on a glass cover over the specimen. Immersion oil has the same refraction as glass and improves the resolution of the observed specimen.
- Use of sample-staining methods for use in microbiology, such as simple stains (methylene blue, safranin, crystal violet) and differential stains (negative stains, flagellar stains, endospore stains).
- Use of a colored (usually blue) or polarizing filter on the light source to highlight features not visible under white light. The use of filters is especially useful with mineral samples.
