= Lenotre =

Lenôtre (also Le Nôtre or LeNotre) is a French family name that may refer to:

== People ==
- Alain LeNôtre, a pastry chef
- André Le Nôtre (1613–1700), principal gardener of King Louis XIV of France
- G. Lenôtre (1855–1935), French playwright
- Gaston Lenôtre (1920–2009), French pastry chef
- Marie LeNôtre (born 1945), Franco-American educational administrator

== Other uses ==
- Lac-Lenôtre, Quebec, an unorganized territory in the Outaouais region of Quebec, Canada
- Culinary Institute Lenôtre, in Houston, Texas

== See also ==
- Le (disambiguation)
- Notre (disambiguation)
