= Jean-Claude Chauray =

French painter (1934–1996)

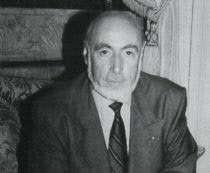
Jean Claude Chauray

Jean-Claude Chauray also known as J.C. Chauray (14 April 1934 - 14 July 1996), was a 20th-century French painter best known for still lifes. He grew up in Mauzé-sur-le Mignon, south-west of France.

He made several still lifes representing fruits (currant, lemon) with faience, pewter, glassware.

His work was exhibited in world's major galleries: Bernheim-Jeune in Paris, Wally Findlay in New York, as well as Tokyo and Osaka in Japan.

In 1994, the porcelain manufacturer Bernardaud made Limoges porcelain with some of his artwork.

Some of his paintings are exhibited in the museum Museum Bernard d'Agesci in Niort, France.

He died in 1996 and rests in the cemetery of Mauzé-sur-le-Mignon.

== Books and sources ==
- François Wiehn, Dictionnaire des peintres des Deux-Sèvres et des sculpteurs, 2012, Editions Geste, ISBN 978-2845619869
- Wally Findlay, Important Paintings by Jean-Claude Chauray, 1990, Wally Findlay Galleries New York
- Wally Findlay, Important Still Life Paintings By the French Contemporary Master Jean-Claude Chauray, 1995, Wally Findlay Galleries, ASIN B003X59FS2
