= Émile Bertrand =

French mineralogist (1844–1909)

Émile Bertrand (1844–1909) was a French mineralogist, in honour of whom bertrandite was named by Alexis Damour. He also gave his name to the Bertrand lens or phase telescope.

He studied at the Ecole des Mines in Paris and was a co-founder of the Société française de minéralogie et de cristallographie. He wrote a book on the application of microscopy to mineralogical studies, "De l'Application du microscope à l'étude de la minéralogie" (1878); published a translation of Ernst Mach's work on the history of mechanics, "La mécanique: exposé historique et critique de son développement" (1904); and is credited with the design of a refractometer.
