= Royal Limoges =

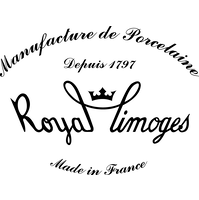
- Formation: 1797
- Founder: François Alluaud
- Founded at: Limoges
- Headquarters: 28 rue Donzelot, Limoges, France
- Products: Limoges porcelain
- Website: https://www.royal-limoges.fr

Royal Limoges is a Limoges porcelain manufacturer. Created in 1797, it is the oldest Limoges porcelain factory still in operation. The nearby Casseaux kiln is classified as a historic monument.

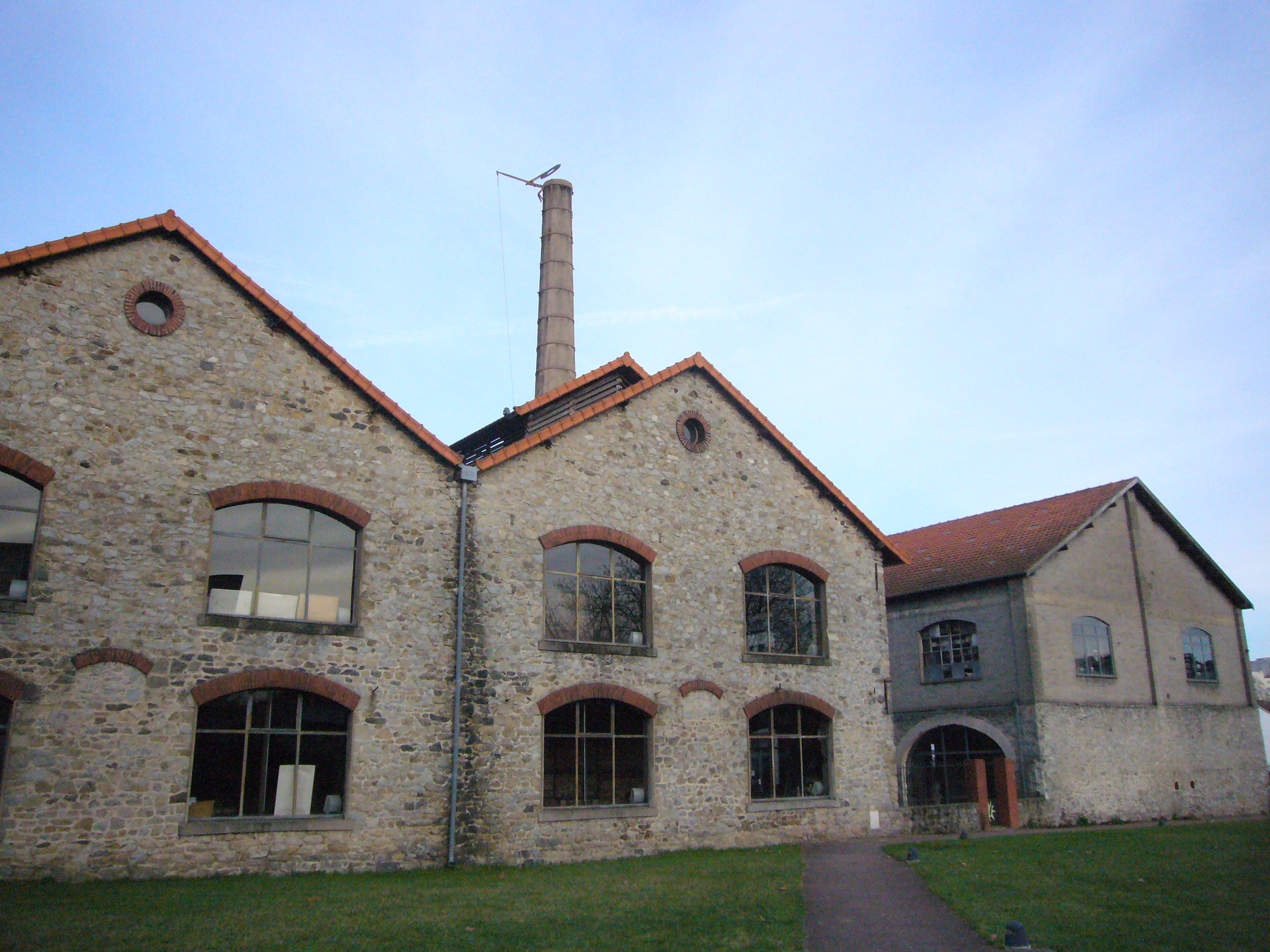
Royal Limoges

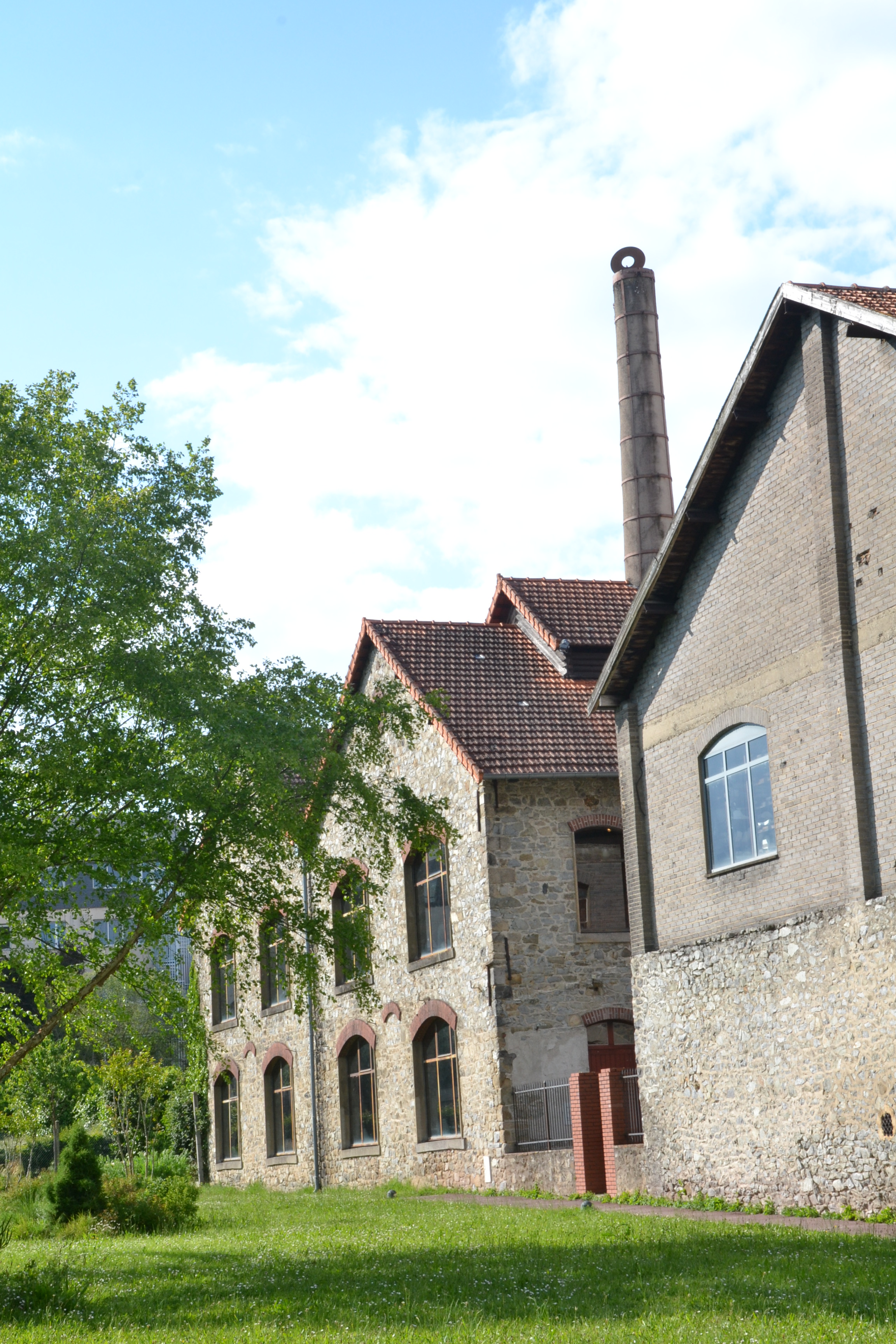
Royal Limoges manufacture

Today, it continues to produce at its historic Casseaux site. The manufacture makes its own porcelain and decorations by its artesans or as requests by clients and are all exclusive.

It offers a wide range of collections including tableware, decorative pieces, tea and coffee sets, gifts and tableware for the hospitality and restaurant industry.

It was successively known under the names of Porcelaines Alluaud, CFH (Charles Field Haviland), GDM (Gérard Dufraisseix and Morel), GDA (Gérard Dufraisseix and Abbott), SLPG (Société Limousine de Gestion Porcelainière) and Royal Limoges.

The company also benefits from the Protected Geographical Indication (PGI).

The manufacture holds the "Entreprise du Patrimoine Vivant" ("Living Heritage Company") label.

Many of its pieces are now in the collection of the Musée national Adrien-Dubouché.
