= François Alluaud =

French mineralogist and geologist

- Born: 21 September 1778; Limoges, France
- Died: 18 February 1866 (aged 87); Limoges, France
- Occupations: porcelain manufacturer, geologist, mineralogist, politician
- Relatives: Charles A. Alluaud (grandson)

François Alluaud (21 September 1778 – 18 February 1866) was a French manufacturer of Limoges porcelain, geologist and mineralogist. He was the grandfather of entomologist Charles Alluaud (1861–1949).

Following the death of his father in 1799, who was also named François Alluaud, he took over ownership of the family porcelain factory in Limoges. The company operated its own quarries; a feldspar mine at Chanteloube and a kaolin quarry at Marcognac.

He was among the first to study the mineralogy and geology of the Limousin region of France. His interest in geology began by way of investigations of kaolin deposits, the key raw material in the manufacture of porcelain. He was founder-president of the Société archéologique et historique du Limousin (1845), and in 1860, was appointed president of the Société d'agriculture, des sciences et des arts de la Haute-Vienne. He also had an interest in politics, being involved in the July Revolution of 1830 and subsequently serving as mayor of Limoges and as prefect of Haute-Vienne.

He was the first to describe the minerals hureaulite (1825) and heterosite (1826). In 1847 Alexis Damour named the mineral alluaudite in his honor.

== Publications ==
- Mémoire sur la minéralogie et sur l’exploitation des mines de la Haute-Vienne, 1809. – Memoir on mineralogy and mining of Haute-Vienne.
- Essai historique sur M. Juge-de-Saint-Martin, ancien magistrat, président honoraire de la Société... d'agriculture, sciences et arts de Limoges, lu à la séance publique de cette Société, du 4 novembre 1825, Limoges : F. Chapoulaud, 1827. – Historical essay on Mr. Juge-de Saint-Martin, etc.
- Du drainage dans la Haute-Vienne, Limoges : impr. de Chapoulaud frères, 1851. – On drainage in Haute-Vienne.
- De l'influence de la cuisson à la houille sur l'avenir des fabriques de porcelaine en Limousin, Limoges : impr. de Chapoulaud frères, (1860) – Involving the use of coal in the future for porcelain factories in Limousin.
- Porcelaine. Historique et statistique de cette poterie en Limousin. Extrait des "Nouvelles Éphémérides du ressort de la cour royale de Limoges..." – Porcelain. History and statistics of this type of pottery in Limousin.
- Aperçu géologique et minéralogique sur le département de la Haute-Vienne, 1860 – Geological and mineralogical overview on the department of Haute-Vienne.
