= Lorenz Bäumer =

French jeweler

- Born: December 28, 1965 (age 60); Washington
- Education: École centrale Paris
- Occupations: Jeweller and Designer
- Website: https://www.baumer-vendome.com/

Lorenz Bäumer (born in 1965 in Washington, D.C.) is a French-German jeweler and the founder and director of the company of the same name located at 19, Place Vendôme Paris, France.

== Biography ==
Lorenz Bäumer was born on December 28, 1965, in Washington D.C., to a French mother and a German diplomatic father. He lived his early years in the United States, Jordan, Germany, Austria, Canada and Israel thanks to his father's diplomatic missions. He moved to Paris at the age of 15 and studied at the Lycée Saint-Louis-de-Gonzague, then entered the École Centrale Paris after two years of preparatory classes at the Lycée Sainte-Geneviève in Versailles. Lorenz Bäumer graduated in 1988 with an engineering degree in Innovation, Design and Production2.

== Career ==
In 1988, he created his first costume jewelry creations, and opened his salon at the 23 rue Royale, in Paris, the following year. He created his jewelry Maison in 1992 and then launched three salons in 1995 at the 4, Place Vendôme, in Paris. In 2009, the Maison joined the Comité Colbert, a committee in charge of promoting the French luxury industry. In late 2010, Charlene Wittstock and Albert II of Monaco chose the designer to create a jewel celebrating their wedding : the "Ecume de diamants" tiara. Lorenz Bäumer also created Academicians' swards for Xavier Darcos, Gabriel de Broglie, Jacques Taddei and Francis Girod.

On June 11, 2013, he opened his first boutique at the 19, Place Vendôme, entirely designed by the jeweller. The iconic collections Battement de Coeur, Inséparables and Pense à Moi are exhibited in the boutique, amongst many others of his creations.

Bäumer sublimates new techniques such as diamond tattooing, working with meteorites and olfactory titanium.

== Collaborations ==
In 1988, Alain Wertheimer puts him in charge of creating jewelry pieces for Chanel: the "Camélia" collection made of sculpted stone, the "Matelassée" pearl ring, the "Coco" ring, and the "Ultra" line, which was the first to use black ceramic for jewelry. This collaboration ended in 2007 when Bernard Arnaud appointed him artistic director of Louis Vuitton Jewelry. He created his first collection, "L'Âme du Voyage", followed by many others, including "Chain Attraction", the "Idylle" collection and "Lock-it". He creates for Louis Vuitton until 2015, when he decides to develop his own Maison.

In 2009, he created Rouge G for Guerlain, as well as two perfume bottles of Baccarat crystal.

He has also collaborated with other Houses, mainly in the luxury sector: Hermès, Cartier, Gucci, Piaget, Bernardaud, Swarovski, Baccarat, Omega, Disney. In 2022, Lorenz Bäumer created Bäumer Design in order to accompany other Maisons in their search for unique designs through advertising and creations.

== Recognition ==
He was made Knight in the Order of Arts and Letters in 2004 and then Officer in 2009. He became Knight of the Légion d'Honneur in 2010. He won the Vogue Joyas Special Prize in tribute to his artistic vision and his professional career in 2009. He received the Audacity Award for Talents in Luxury and Creation in 2017.
