= Phase telescope =

Light microscope accessory

A phase telescope or Bertrand lens is an optical device used in aligning the various optical components of a light microscope. In particular it allows observation of the back focal plane of the objective lens and its conjugated focal planes. The phase telescope/Bertrand lens is inserted into the microscope in place of an eyepiece to move the intermediate image plane to a point where it can be observed.

Phase telescopes are primarily used for aligning the optical components required for Köhler illumination and phase contrast microscopy. For Köhler illumination the light source and condenser diaphragm should appear in focus at the back focal plane of the objective lens. For phase contrast microscopy the phase ring (at the back focal plane of the objective) and the annulus (at the back focal plane of the condenser lens) should appear in focus and in alignment.

Bertrand lenses find use in creating interference figures and assisting in aligning a microscope to generate interference figures. The name Bertrand lens commemorates French mineralogist Emile Bertrand (1844-1909), for whom the mineral Bertrandite is also named.
