= Critical illumination =

Critical illumination or Nelsonian illumination is a method of specimen illumination used for transmitted and reflected light (trans- and epi-illuminated) optical microscopy. Critical illumination focuses an image of a light source on to the specimen for bright illumination. Critical illumination generally has problems with evenness of illumination as an image of the illumination source (for example a halogen lamp filament) is visible in the resulting image. Köhler illumination has largely replaced critical illumination in modern scientific light microscopy although it requires additional optics which may not be present in less expensive and simpler light microscopes.

== Optical principles ==
The optical setup and light path of critical illumination showing the conjugate image planes of the various optical components.

Critical illumination acts to form an image of the light source on the specimen to illuminate it. This image is formed by the condenser or collector lens. This illumination is bright but not always even, as any structure in the light source (for example the filament of a light bulb) will be visible in the resulting image. Homogeneous light sources such as a flame or sunlight give more even illumination. Alternatively, a ground or opal glass diffuser can be used to homogenize the light source, but this will cause a significant amount of light to be scattered away from the sample.

== See also ==
- Optical microscopy
- August Köhler
