= Marie LeNôtre =

French education administrator and philanthropist

Marie Lenotre
- Born: 1945 (age 80–81); France
- Known for: Co-founder of the Culinary Institute Lenotre

Marie Lenotre (born 1945) is a French-American higher education administrator and the co-founder and director of the Culinary Institute Lenotre.

Lenotre is married to Alain Lenotre. The couple co-founded the Culinary Institute Lenotre in 1998.

Lenotre is the author of Appetites, a Memoir. In her book, she writes about her life with Alain Lenotre, their business history and their journey to the United States.

== Education ==
Marie Lenotre has a bachelor's degree in drama from the University of Athens in Greece, a bachelor's degree in psychology and a master's degree in English and creative writing both from the University of Houston, and a master's in public health from the University of Texas Health Science Center at Houston.

== Philanthropy ==
Lenotre is the founder and president of the Gaston Lenotre Scholarship, a nonprofit that raises scholarship funds for underprivileged students who wish to aspire to a culinary career.

She is the previous president of the Houston chapter of Les Dames d'Escoffier.

Lenotre is a member of the board of trustees of the Moores School of Music.

== Awards ==
In October 2011, LeNôtre was awarded by the Government of France with the Order of Merit at an event officiated by Daniel Boulud and in the presence of Thomas Keller and Jérôme Bocuse.
