= Notre =

Notre may refer to:

- Notre language (ISO 639 language code bly), a Gur language found in Benin
- André Le Nôtre (1613–1700), French landscape architect

== See also ==
- Lenotre (disambiguation)
- Notre Dame (disambiguation)
