= Alluaudite =

Relatively common alkaline manganese iron phosphate mineral

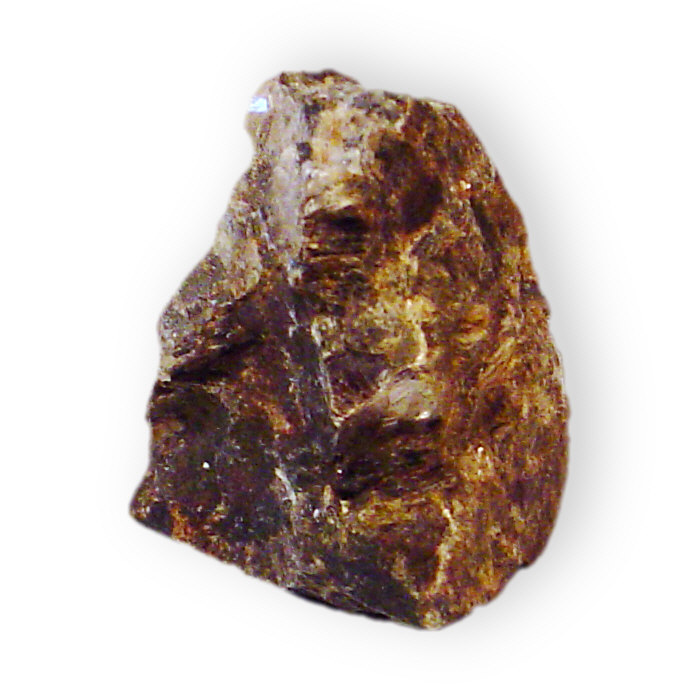
- Alluaudite

General
- Category: Phosphate minerals
- Formula: (Na,Ca)Mn^{2+}(Fe^{3+},Mn^{2+},Fe^{2+},Mg)_{2}(PO_{4})_{3}
- IMA symbol: Ald
- Strunz classification: 8.AC.10
- Dana classification: 38.2.3.6
- Crystal system: Monoclinic
- Crystal class: Prismatic (2/m) (same H-M symbol)
- Space group: C2/c
- Unit cell: a = 11.03 Å, b = 12.53 Å c = 6.4 Å; β = 97.57°; Z = 4

Identification
- Color: Dirty yellow to brownish yellow, grayish green; superficially dull greenish black, brownish black, black, when altered
- Crystal habit: Platy to radiating fibrous, nodular, granular, massive
- Twinning: Polysynthetic
- Cleavage: Distinct/ good on {100} and {010}, good on {110}
- Mohs scale hardness: 5 – 5.5
- Streak: Brownish yellow
- Diaphaneity: Translucent
- Specific gravity: 3.4 – 3.5
- Optical properties: Biaxial (+)
- Refractive index: n_{α} = 1.782 n_{β} = 1.802 n_{γ} = 1.835
- Birefringence: δ = 0.053
- Pleochroism: X = pale olive-green, straw-yellow to greenish yellow; Z = pale olive-greenish to brownish yellow
- 2V angle: Measured: 50° to 90°, calculated: 78°

Alluaudite is a relatively common alkaline manganese iron phosphate mineral with the chemical formula (Na,Ca)Mn^{2+}(Fe^{3+},Mn^{2+},Fe^{2+},Mg)_{2}(PO_{4})_{3}. It occurs as metasomatic replacement in granitic pegmatites and within phosphatic nodules in shales.

It was first described in 1848 for an occurrence in Skellefteå, Västerbotten, Sweden. It was named by Alexis Damour after François Alluaud (II) (1778–1866). The mineral structure was first described in 1955.
