= Köhler illumination =

Method of specimen illumination used in optical microscopy

Köhler illumination is a method of specimen illumination used for transmitted and reflected light (trans- and epi-illuminated) optical microscopy. Köhler illumination acts to generate an even illumination of the sample and ensures that an image of the illumination source (for example a halogen lamp filament) is not visible in the resulting image. Köhler illumination is the predominant technique for sample illumination in modern scientific light microscopy. It requires additional optical elements which are more expensive and may not be present in more basic light microscopes.

== History and motivation ==
Prior to Köhler illumination, critical illumination was the predominant technique for sample illumination. Critical illumination has the major limitation that the image of the light source (typically a light bulb) falls in the same plane as the image of the specimen, i.e., the bulb filament is visible in the final image. The image of the light source is often referred to as the filament image. Critical illumination therefore gives uneven illumination of the sample; bright regions in the filament image illuminate those regions of the sample more strongly. Uneven illumination is undesirable as it can introduce artifacts such as glare and shadowing in the image.

Various methods can be used to diffuse the filament image, including reducing power to the light source or using an opal glass bulb or an opal glass diffuser between the bulb and the sample. These methods are all, to some extent, functional at reducing the unevenness of illumination; however, they all reduce intensity of illumination and alter the range of wavelengths of light which reach the sample.

To address these limitations August Köhler designed a method of illumination which uses a perfectly defocused image of the light source to illuminate the sample. This work was published in 1893 in the Zeitschrift für wissenschaftliche Mikroskopie and was soon followed by publication of an English translation in the Journal of the Royal Microscopical Society.

Köhler illumination has also been developed in the context of nonimaging optics.

== Optical principles ==
The primary limitation of critical illumination is the formation of an image of the light source in the specimen image plane. Köhler illumination addresses this by ensuring the image of the light source is perfectly defocused in the sample plane and its conjugate image planes. In a ray diagram of the illumination light path, this can be seen as the image-forming rays passing parallel through the sample.

Köhler illumination requires several optical components to function:

1. Collector lens and/or field lens
2. Field diaphragm
3. Condenser diaphragm
4. Condenser lens

Schematics of Köhler illumination. Top: Illumination beam path, conjugated planes marked with the light green bar. Bottom: Imaging beam path, conjugated planes marked with the light blue bar. In this illustration the NA of the condenser is equal to the NA of the objective. See text for further details.

These components lie in this order between the light source and the specimen and control the illumination of the specimen. The collector/field lenses act to collect light from the light source and focus it at the plane of the condenser diaphragm. The condenser lens acts to project this light, without focusing it, through the sample. This illumination scheme creates two sets of conjugate image planes, one with the light source and its images and one with the specimen and its images. These two sets of image planes are found at the following points (see image for numbers and letters):

Light source image planes / conjugate aperture planes (labeled with the light green bar in the above image):
- Lamp filament (1)
- Condenser diaphragm (2)
- Back focal plane of the objective (3)
- The eyepoint (the entrance pupil of the eye) (4)
Specimen image planes / conjugate field planes (labeled with the light blue bar in the above image):
- Field diaphragm (A)
- Specimen (B)
- Intermediate image plane (the eyepiece diaphragm) (C)
- The eye retina or camera sensor (D)

== Advantages ==
The primary advantage of Köhler illumination is the uniform illumination of the sample. This reduces image artifacts and provides high sample contrast. Uniform illumination of the sample is also critical for advanced illumination techniques such as phase contrast and differential interference contrast microscopy.

Adjusting the condenser diaphragm alters sample contrast. Furthermore, altering the size of the condenser diaphragm allows adjustment of sample depth of field by altering the effective numerical aperture of the microscope. The role of the condenser diaphragm is analogous to the aperture in photography although the condenser diaphragm of a microscope functions by controlling illumination of the specimen, while the aperture of a camera functions by controlling illumination of the detector.

Altering the condenser diaphragm allows the amount of light entering the sample to be freely adjusted without altering the wavelengths of light present, in contrast to reducing power to the light source with critical illumination (which changes the color temperature of the lamp). This adjustment is always coupled to an alteration of the numerical aperture of the system, as stated above, and so adjustment of the illumination source intensity by other means is still necessary.

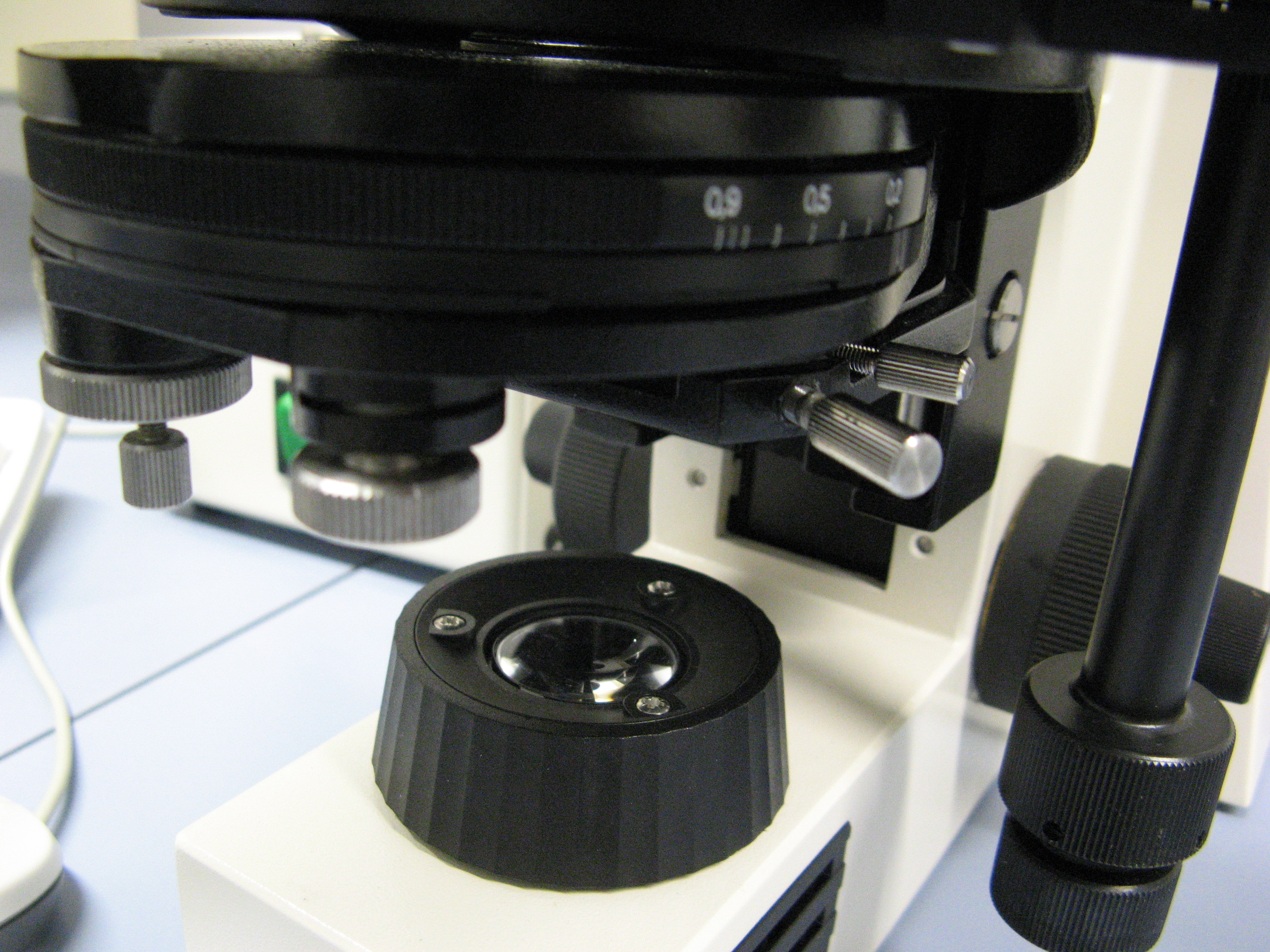
Field iris diaphragm in the base of a transmitted light microscope. The aperture is adjusted using the black handwheel.

By adjustment of the field diaphragm, the image of the field diaphragm aperture in the sample plane is set to a size slightly larger than the imaged region of the sample (which corresponds in turn to the portion of the sample image thrown into the eyepiece field stop). As the field diaphragm, sample, and eyepiece field stop all lie on conjugate image planes, this adjustment allows the illuminating rays to completely fill the eyepiece field of view, while minimizing the amount of extraneous light which must be blocked by the eyepiece field stop. Such extraneous light scatters inside the system and degrades contrast.

== Testing for and setting up Köhler illumination ==
Microscopes using Köhler illumination must be routinely checked for correct alignment. The realignment procedure tests whether the correct optical components are in focus at the two sets of conjugate image planes; the light source image planes and the specimen image planes.

Alignment of optical components on the specimen image plane is typically performed by first loading a test specimen and bringing it into focus by moving the objective or the specimen. The field diaphragm is then partially closed; the edges of the diaphragm should be in the same conjugate image planes as the specimen, therefore should appear in focus. The focus can be adjusted by raising or lowering the condenser lenses and diaphragm. Finally, the field diaphragm is reopened to just beyond the field of view.

In order to test the alignment of components on the light source image plane, the eyepiece must be removed to allow observation of the intermediate image plane (the position of the eyepiece diaphragm) either directly or by using a phase telescope/Bertrand lens. The light source (e.g. the bulb filament) and the edges of the condenser diaphragm should appear in focus. Any optical components at the back focal plane of the objective (e.g. the phase ring for phase contrast microscopy) and at the condenser diaphragm (e.g. the annulus for phase contrast microscopy) should also appear in focus.

== See also ==
- Köhler integration
- Spatial filtering, the optical principle implemented in the Köhler illuminator's field diaphragm
- Polarized light microscopy
- Hoffman modulation contrast microscopy
