= Phenakite =

Nesosilicate mineral

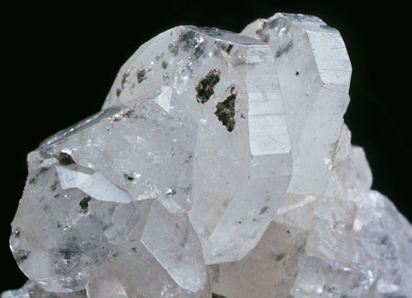
- Phenakite crystals

General
- Category: Nesosilicate
- Formula: Be_{2}SiO_{4}
- IMA symbol: Phk
- Strunz classification: 9.AA.05
- Crystal system: Trigonal
- Crystal class: Rhombohedral (3̅); H-M symbol: (3̅)
- Space group: R3̅
- Unit cell: a = 12.438 Å, c = 8.231 Å; Z = 18

Identification
- Color: Colorless, yellow, pink, brown
- Crystal habit: Tabular, prismatic to acicular crystals often as columnar aggregates, as spherulites and granular
- Twinning: Penetration twins around {0001}
- Cleavage: Distinct on {112̅0}, imperfect on {101̅1}
- Fracture: Conchoidal
- Tenacity: Brittle
- Mohs scale hardness: 7.5–8
- Luster: Vitreous
- Diaphaneity: Transparent to translucent
- Specific gravity: 2.93–3.00
- Optical properties: Uniaxial (+)
- Refractive index: n_{ω} = 1.650 – 1.656 n_{ε} = 1.667 – 1.670
- Birefringence: δ = 0.017
- Other characteristics: Bright blue cathodoluminescence

Phenakite or phenacite is a fairly rare nesosilicate mineral consisting of beryllium orthosilicate, Be_{2}SiO_{4}. Occasionally used as a gemstone, phenakite occurs as isolated crystals, which are rhombohedral with parallel-faced hemihedrism, and are either lenticular or prismatic in habit: the lenticular habit is determined by the development of faces of several obtuse rhombohedra and the absence of prism faces. There is no cleavage, and the fracture is conchoidal. The Mohs hardness is high, being 7.5–8; the specific gravity is 2.96. The crystals are sometimes perfectly colorless and transparent, but more often they are greyish or yellowish and only translucent; occasionally they are pale rose-red. In general appearance the mineral is not unlike quartz, for which indeed it has been mistaken. Its name comes from Ancient Greek: φέναξ, romanized: phénax, meaning "deceiver" due to its close visual similarity to quartz, named by Nils Gustaf Nordenskiöld in 1833.

== Largest phenakite ==
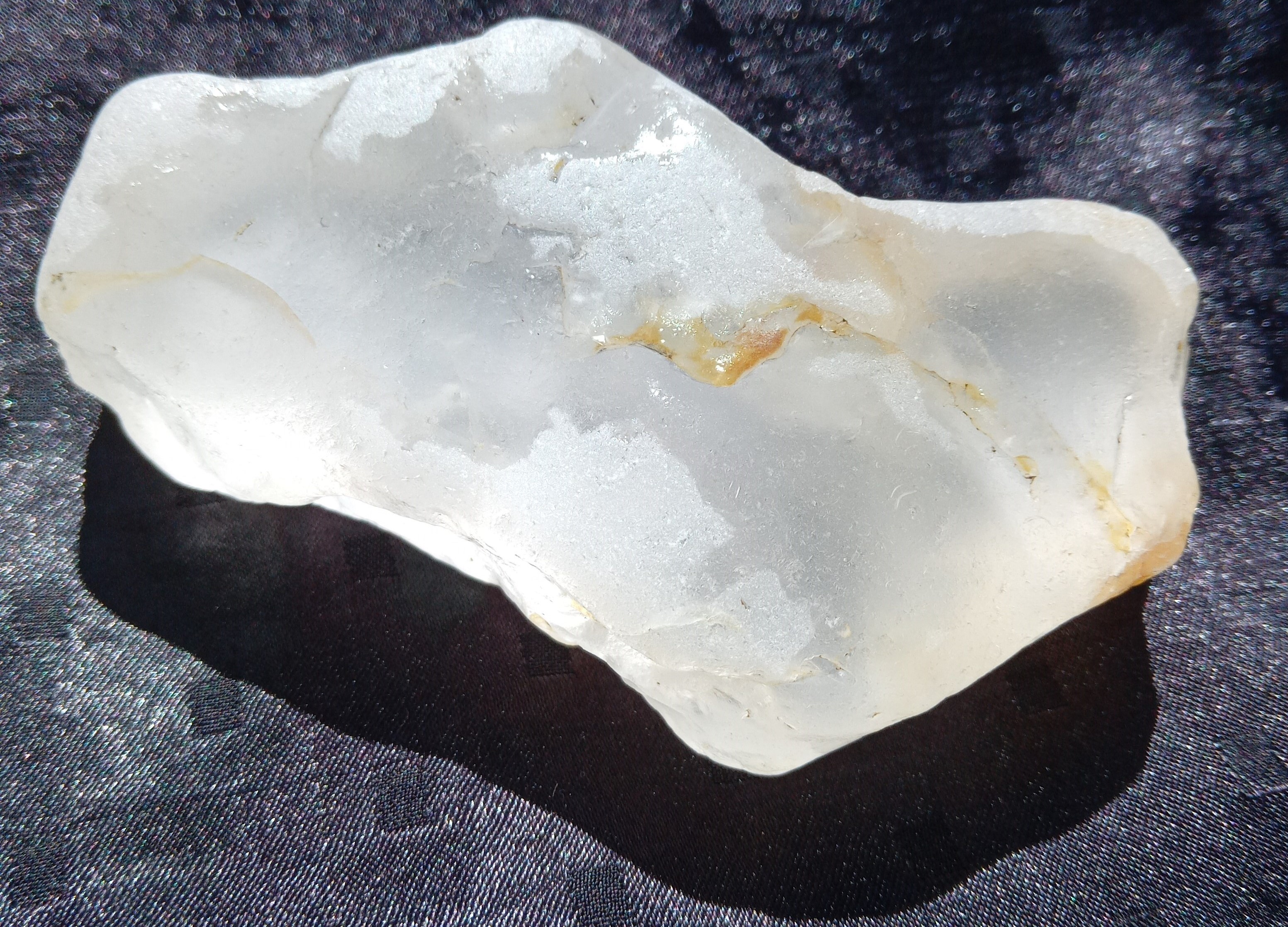
Largest phenakite found in Sri Lanka (616.9 cts)

A large phenakite gemstone has been found in Sri Lanka. Found on November 18, 2021, this gemstone weighs 616.9 carats which makes it the largest of its kind. It is owned by a gem dealer from Beruwala, Sri Lanka, and reported to be worth around SL Rs. 1 billion (US $5 million).

== Occurrence ==
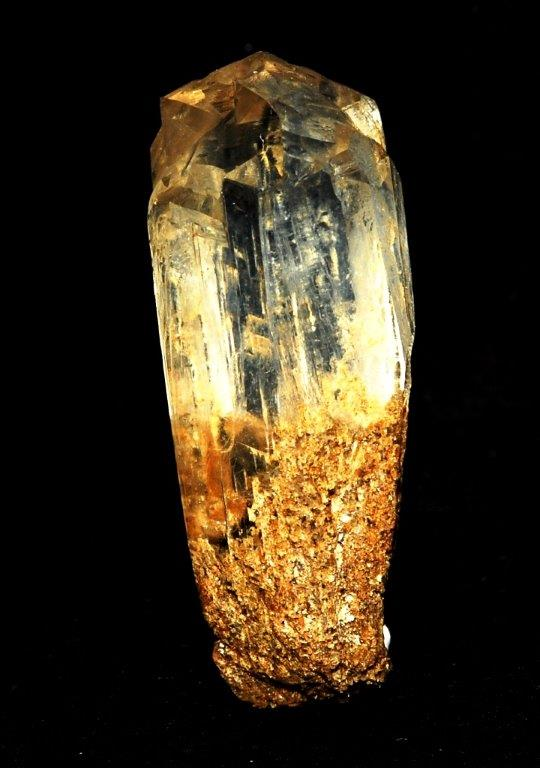
Phenakite crystal from the Noumas II Pegmatite, South Africa (Size: 1.2 × 0.5 × 0.4 cm)

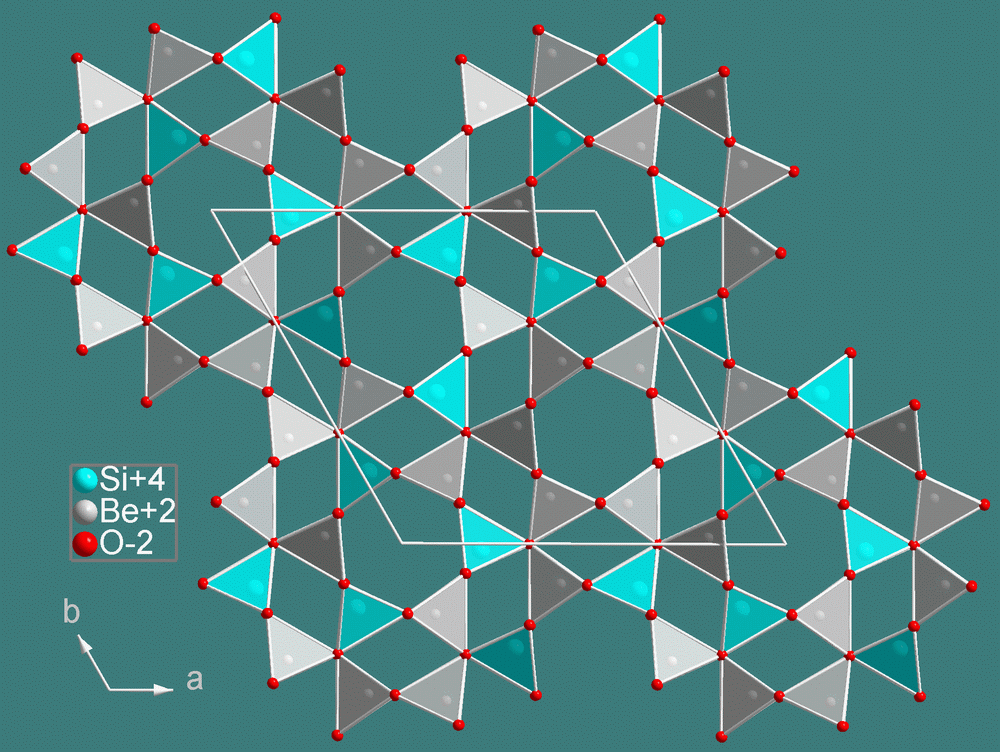
Crystal structure of phenakite viewed along the c axis

Phenakite is found in high-temperature pegmatite veins and in mica-schists associated with quartz, chrysoberyl, apatite and topaz. It has long been known from the emerald and chrysoberyl mine on the Takovaya stream, near Yekaterinburg in the Urals of Russia, where large crystals occur in mica-schist. It is also found with topaz and amazonite in the granite of the Ilmen Mountains in the southern Urals and of the Pikes Peak region in Colorado, US. Additionally in Colorado, phenakite is found in the Mount Antero area with aquamarine, bertrandite, and fluorite. Small, gem grade individual crystals of phenakite showing a prismatic habit are noted in beryl dissolution cavities at the Noumas II Pegmatite, part of the Orange River pegmatite belt in the Northern Cape of South Africa. Large crystals of prismatic habit have been found in a feldspar quarry in Kragerø Municipality in Norway. Framont near Schirmeck in Alsace is another well-known locality. Still larger crystals, measuring 12 inches (300 mm) in diameter and weighing 28 lb (13 kg). have been found at Greenwood in Maine, but these are pseudomorphs of quartz after phenakite.

For gem purposes the stone is cut in the brilliant form, of which there are two fine examples, weighing 34 and 43 carats (6.8 and 8.6 g), in the British Museum. The indices of refraction are higher than those of quartz, beryl or topaz; a faceted phenakite is consequently rather brilliant and may sometimes be mistaken for diamond.
