= Alfred Des Cloizeaux =

French mineralogist

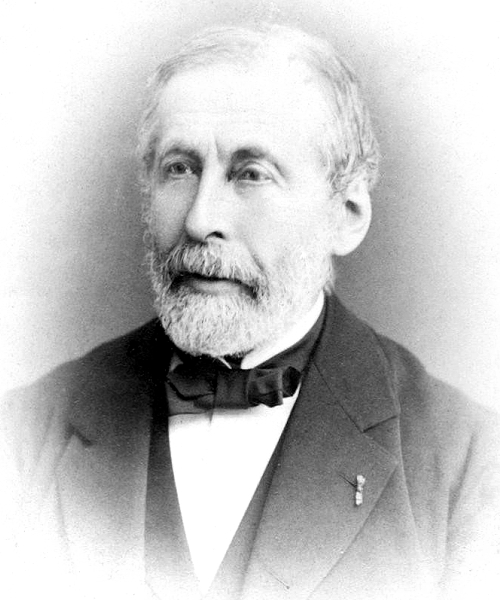
- Born: 17 October 1817
- Died: 6 May 1897 (aged 79)
- Scientific career
- Fields: Mineralogy
- Thesis: De l'emploi des propriétés optiques biréfringentes en minéralogie (1857)

Alfred Louis Olivier Legrand Des Cloizeaux (17 October 1817 – 6 May 1897) was a French mineralogist.

Des Cloizeaux was born at Beauvais, in the department of Oise. He studied with Jean-Baptiste Biot at the Collège de France. He became professor of mineralogy at the École Normale Supérieure and afterwards at the Muséum National d'Histoire Naturelle in Paris. He studied the geysers of Iceland, and wrote also on the classification of some of the eruptive rocks.

His main work consisted in the systematic examination of the crystals of numerous minerals, in researches on their optical properties and on the subject of light polarization. He demonstrated the circular polarization of cinnabar.

He wrote especially on the means of determining the different feldspars, and is credited with the discovery of microcline (a triclinic potash-feldspar). He named the minerals montebrasite (1871), binnite (a variety of tennantite) and Christianite (in honor of Christian VIII of Denmark). In 1854, Alexis Damour dedicated the mineral descloizite in honor of Des Cloizeaux.

Des Cloizeaux was elected as a member of the French Academy of Sciences in 1869, and was its president in 1889. He was awarded the Wollaston Medal by the Geological Society of London in 1886. He was elected as a member to the American Philosophical Society in 1878. His best-known books are Leçons de cristallographie (1861) and Manuel de minéralogie (2 vols., Paris, 1862, 1874 and 1893).

== See also ==
- Physical crystallography before X-rays
