= Charles A. Alluaud =

French entomologist

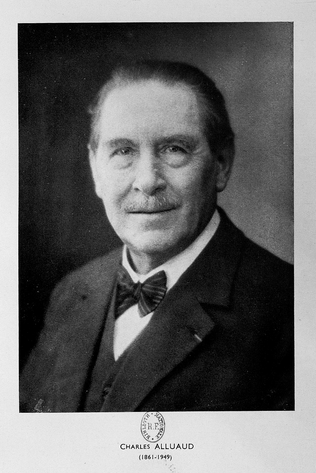
Charles A. Alluaud

Charles A. Alluaud (4 May 1861, Limoges – 12 December 1949, Crozant) was a French entomologist.

== Biography ==
The Alluaud family had owned porcelain factories since the 18th century. His great grandfather had been chairman of the Ancienne Manufacture Royale de Limoges and his grandfather, François Alluaud (1778–1866), was a porcelain manufacturer, archaeologist, and geologist. Jean-Baptiste-Camille Corot (1796–1875) taught painting to Charles and his brother Eugene.

Charles left Limoges for Paris to supplement his studies but was an undisciplined pupil. The death of his parents enabled him to become an explorer. From 1887 to 1930, he went on many journeys in Africa (Ivory Coast, Madagascar, Kilimanjaro, Tunisia, Morocco, Sudan, the Sahara, Niger), the Canary Islands, Seychelles and Mascarene Islands. He assembled important collections of insects during his voyages, later giving these to the entomology department of the Muséum national d'histoire naturelle. He was the author of 165 entomological publications. He was president of the Société entomologique de France in 1899 and 1914.

== Legacy ==
Emmanuel Drake del Castillo (1855–1904) dedicated the plant genus Alluaudia to him.

A genus and three species of reptiles are named in his honor: Alluaudina, Amphiglossos alluaudi, Langaha alluaudi, and Uroplatus alluaudi. A species of ant, Plagiolepis alluaudi, is also named after him.

== Selected works ==
- Voyage de Ch. Alluaud et R. Jeannel en Afrique Orientale (1911–1912). Résultats scientifiques, 1-6. (1913–1919).

== Sources ==
- Jean Lhoste (1987). French Entomologists. 1750–1950. INRA Editions: 351 p.
- Translation from French Wikipedia
