= Alexis Damour =

French mineralogist (1808–1902)

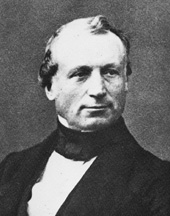
Augustin-Alexis Damour

Augustin Alexis Damour (19 July 1808, in Paris – 22 September 1902, in Paris) was a French mineralogist who was also interested in prehistory.

== Biography ==
In 1827 he studied under Alexandre Brongniart at the Muséum d'Histoire Naturelle in Paris, and up until 1854, worked for the Ministère des affaires étrangères. Afterwards, he devoted himself to mineralogical research, achieving fame for his research involving the chemical composition of many different minerals.

In addition to his solo analyses of various minerals, with Jean-Baptiste Boussingault, he studied obsidian under high temperatures, and with Henri Étienne Sainte-Claire Deville, he investigated the nature of columbite. Also, he is credited with the discovery of numerous new mineral species; faujasite, bertrandite, jacobsite and alluaudite, to name a few. In 1854 he named the mineral descloizite in honor of Alfred Des Cloizeaux. In 1845 Achille Ernest Oscar Joseph Delesse named a variety of muscovite, "damourite", in his honor.

In 1857 he was appointed president of the Société géologique de France, and in 1881, by way of a recommendation from Wolfgang Franz von Kobell, he became a member of the Royal Bavarian Academy of Sciences. His collections are held by the Muséum de Toulouse.

== Gallery ==
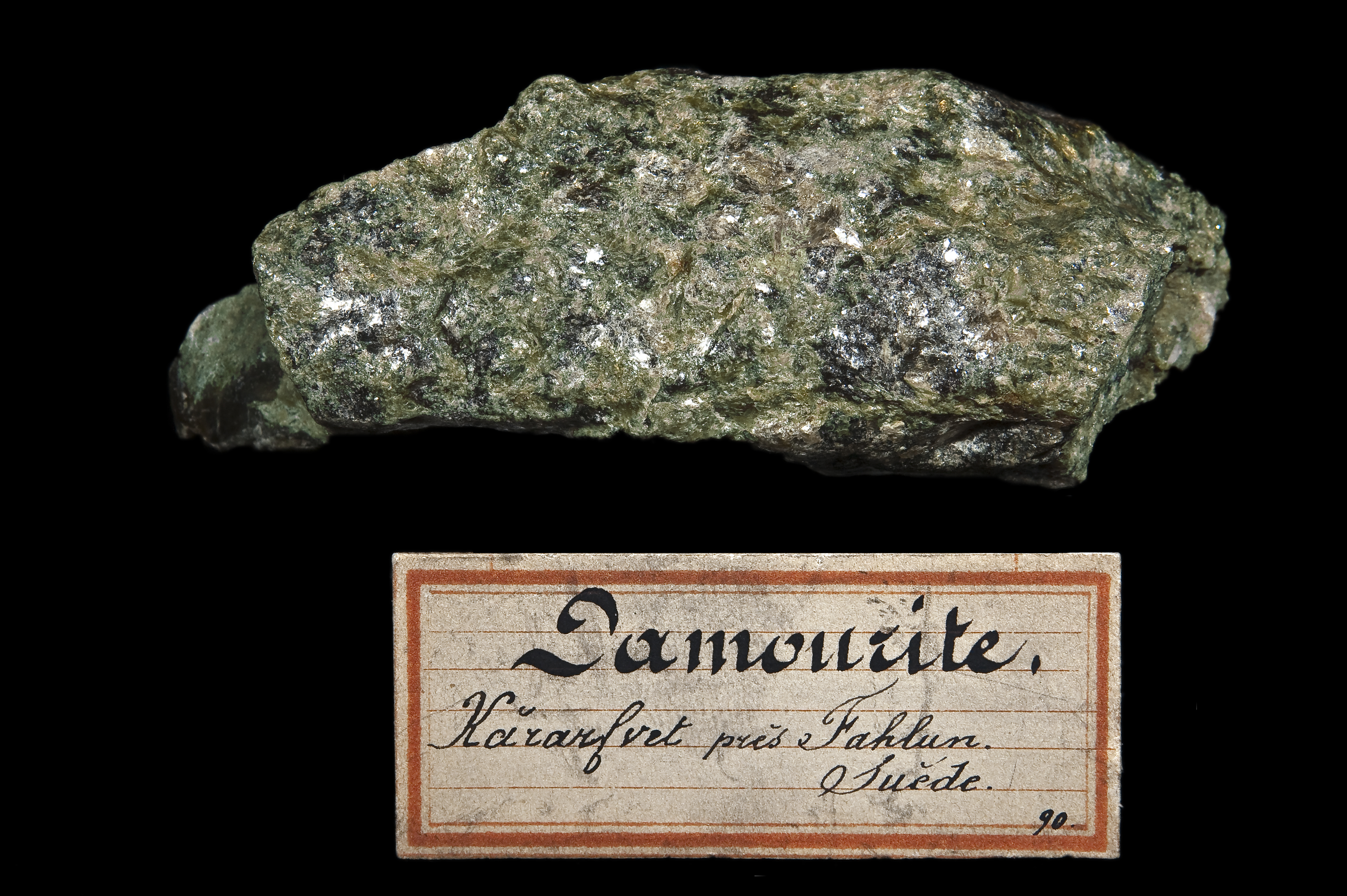
Damourite - Kårarvet, Suède Damour collection MHNT

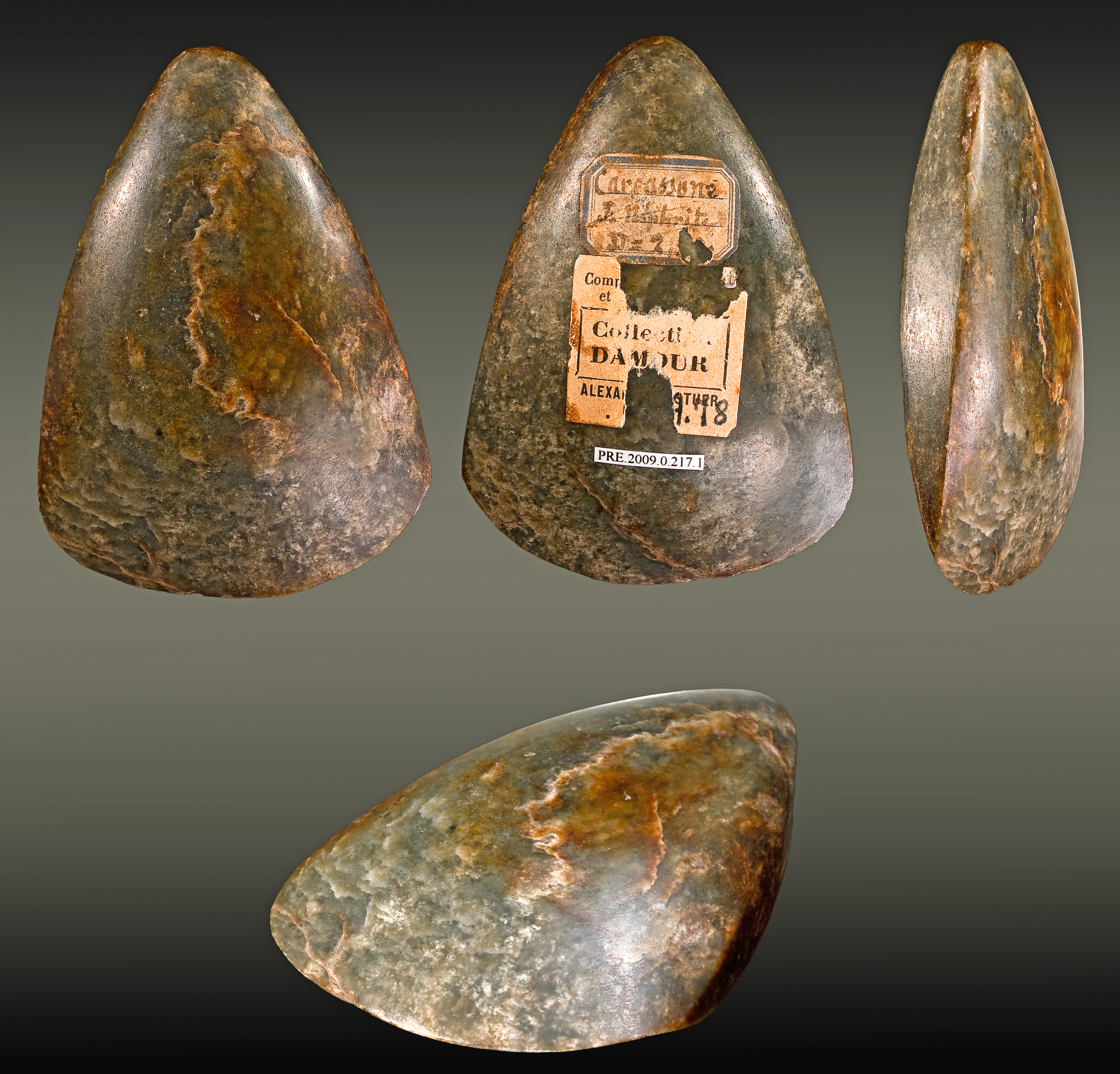
Polished Neolithic axe Damour collection MHNT

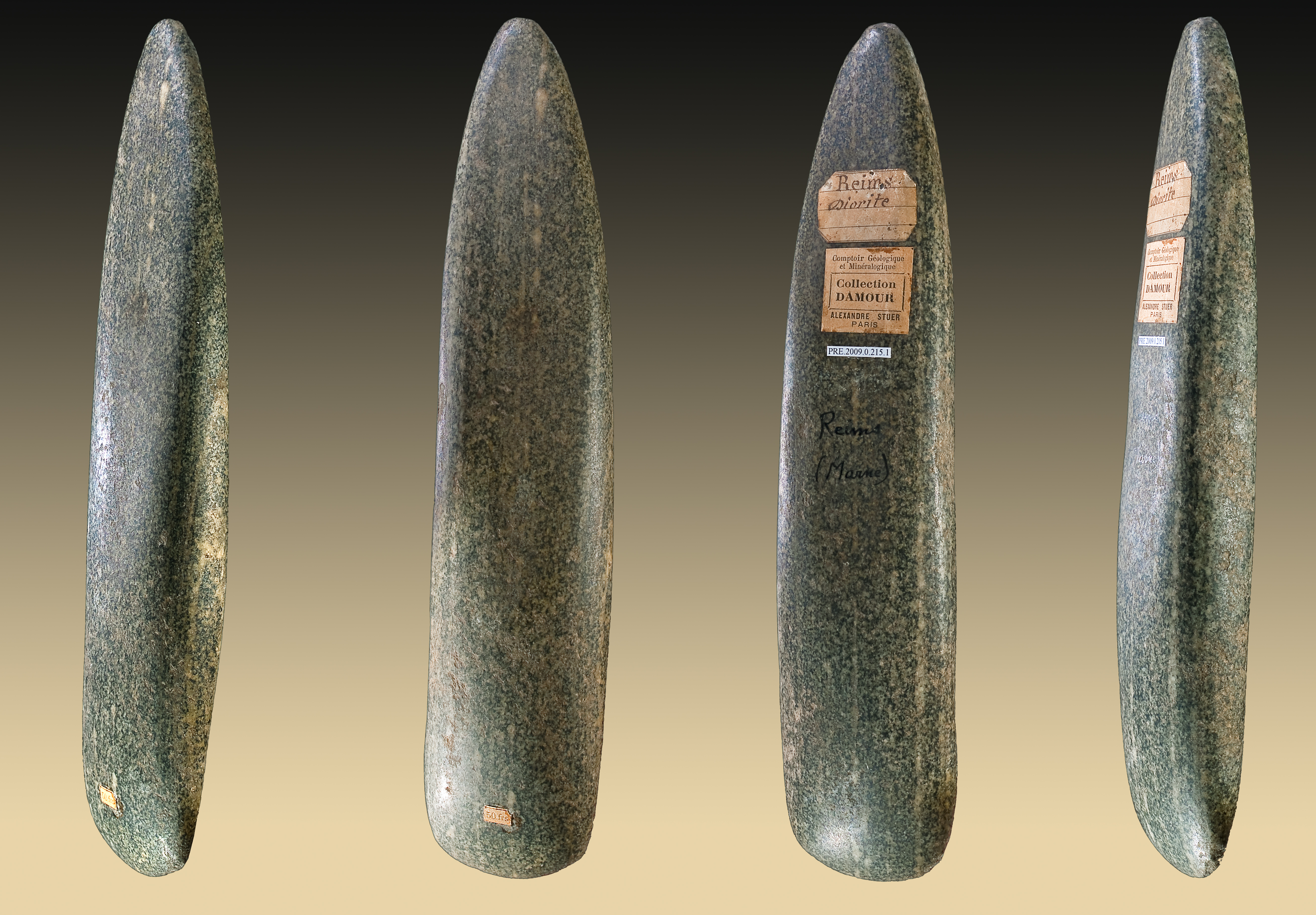
Polished Neolithic axe Damour collection MHNT

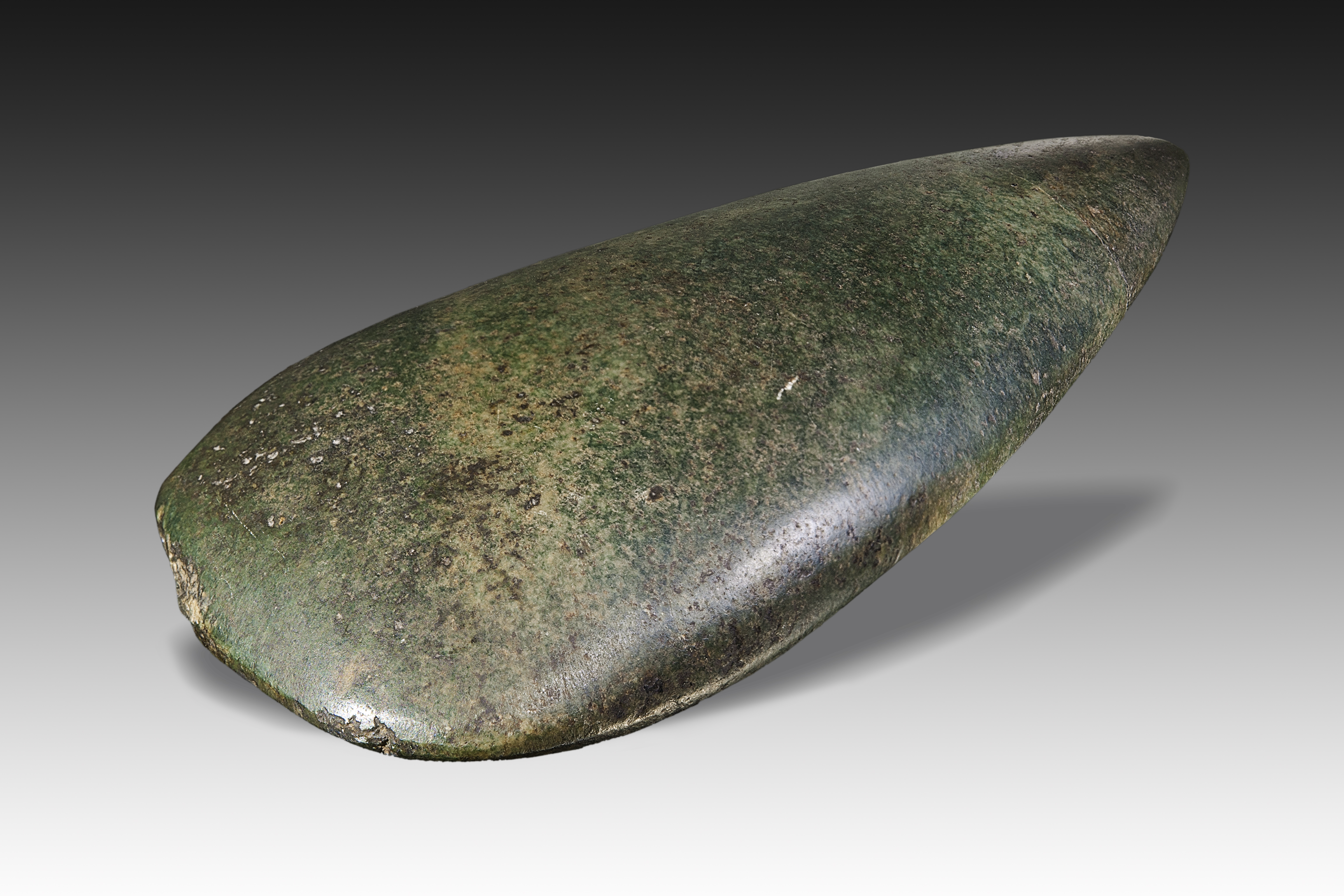
Neolithic axe Damour collection MHNT
