= Alain Lenotre =

French chef

Alain Lenotre is a certified pastry chef, candy maker, and ice cream maker. He was trained as a cook at a famous three-star Michelin restaurant in Paris, the Grand Véfour. He was also the General Director of LENOTRE PARIS from 1972 to 1982. In addition, he received a Master Baker Certificate from Retail Bakers of America in July 1987.

In 1998, Alain and Marie Lenotre opened the Culinary Institute Lenôtre.

In October 2011, Alain Lenotre opened Le Bistro. Located within the Culinary Institute Lenotre, the Lounge is a restaurant open to the public while also serving as a training center for students.
