= Made in France =

Merchandise mark

Made in France is a merchandise mark indicating that a product is planned, manufactured and packed in France.

Arnaud Montebourg is the industry minister and architect of a "Made in France" campaign.

In the European Union, a state which would make "made in France" or "made in Germany" labelling mandatory would infringe EU law which aim free competition, according to the Court of Justice of the European Union.

== Made in France ==
Although labelling is not mandatory, there are many certifications which attest to the fabrication of a product on French soil: Made in France; Origine France Garantie; The Living Heritage Company Label; Terre Textile label; Designations of Origins and the Protected Geographical Indication (PGI) label. The traditional ‘Made in France’ label is an incontestable draw for customers – the Pro France Ifop survey (September 2018) reported that two thirds of French people ‘often’ or ‘systematically’ take the product’s origin into account when they buy a product or service, and that three quarters of French people would be prepared to pay more for a product labelled as ‘Made in France’.

The Customs Code of the DGDDI (the General Directorate of Customs and Indirect Taxation) are responsible for protecting the French origin marking on products at import, and thus obtaining the ‘Made in France’ label.

According to Article 39 of the Customs Code, a product is “Made in France" if it has ‘undergone its last economically justified substantial transformation, carried out in a company equipped for this purpose, resulting in the manufacture of a new product or one that corresponds to an important stage of manufacture’ in France. The certification is also attributed to products where at least 45% of the unit cost price has been acquired in France.

== Origine France Garantie ==
A product is certified as "Origine France Garantie" if at least 50% of the unit cost price has been acquired in France, and if product took on its essential or definitive characteristics in France. Independent audits verify that these specifications have been met and consumers can check obtention of the certification thanks to a certification number.

== The Living Heritage Company (EPV) label ==
The EPV certification recognises companies that manufacture high quality products reflecting French excellence on French soil. It was set up in 2005 and managed by the Ministry of Economy and Finance. The entry decision is made by a committee composed of technical experts from the given craft or industrial sector and renewed every five years. It is split into sixteen sections.

== Designations of Origin ==
Controlled and Protected Designations of Origin (AOC and PDO) are certifications for products which have had all their stages of production, elaboration and processing performed in the same geographical area, according to a recognised standard of practice. The AOC and PDO have the same criteria. The AOC is the first step towards obtaining the PDO, which is recognised at the European Union level.

== The Protected Geographical Indication (PGI) label ==
The PGI isn’t as strict as the AOC and PDO as the production, processing and preparation of the product do not have to be carried out in the same geographical area. There is an exception for wine production for which all the operations carried out, must be carried out in the same geographical area.

== The Terre Textile label ==
The Terre Textile label was created in 2008 by the France Terre Textile Federation. It aims to reflect the textile know-how of each region. It is divided into 5 sub-labels: Vosges, Alsace, Nord, Troyes -Champagne and Auvergne-Rhône-Alpes. It is audited by two independent organisations: the Institut Français du Textile et de l'Habillement and CETELOR - Centre d'Essais Textile Lorrain.

== Regional labels ==
The regional labels were created by associations of professionals, with the objective of promoting their regional products. They are self-managed, and are not verified by a third party.

Some examples of regional labels are:- - Produit en Bretagne - Marque Savoie - Saveurs en Or (Hauts de France)

== Websites supporting products Made in France or local artisans in a specific area ==
Marques-de-france have an online directory of products ‘Made in France’ and natif-creatif have an online directory of local artisans. L'Embrasse Coeur has also an online directory of local creators specialised in motherhood and baby products.

== Other certifications and labels ==
• The big ‘CE’ on product packaging in the European Economic Area indicates that the product complies with the European Union’s technical standards. It does not indicate the origins of the ingredients or where it was made. • The brands ‘Reflets de France’, ‘Saveurs de Nos Régions’, ‘Nos Régions Ont du Talent’ are not regional labels. They were created and are managed by large distribution chains like Carrefour, Leclerc and Auchan.

== MIF Expo (Made in France Exhibition) ==
Since 2012, an exhibition dedicated to goods producted in France takes place at the Paris Expo Porte de Versailles in Paris.
