= August Köhler =

German scientist (1886–1948)

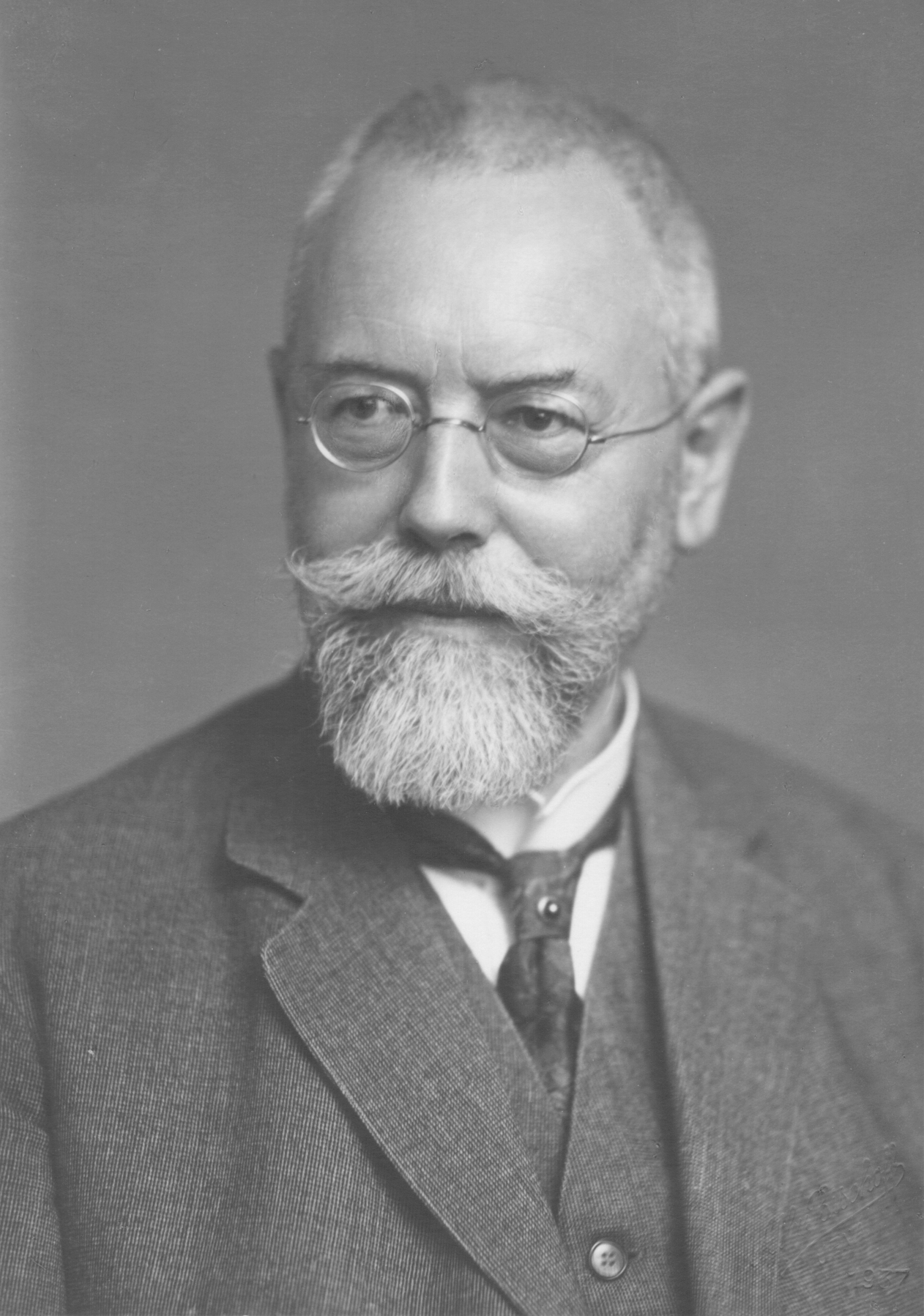
- Köhler c. 1930
- Born: 4 March 1866; Darmstadt, Grand Duchy of Hesse
- Died: 12 March 1948 (aged 82); Jena, Germany
- Education: University of Heidelberg; University of Giessen
- Known for: Köhler illumination
- Awards: honorary doctor degree of the University of Jena
- Scientific career
- Fields: Physicist
- Workplaces: University of Giessen; University of Jena; Zeiss Optical Works
- Doctoral advisor: Johann Wilhelm Spengel

August Karl Johann Valentin Köhler (4 March 1866 – 12 March 1948), was a German professor and early staff member of Carl Zeiss AG in Jena, Germany. He is best known for his development of the microscopy technique of Köhler illumination, an important principle in optimizing microscopic resolution power by evenly illuminating the field of view. This invention revolutionized light microscope design and is widely used in traditional as well as modern digital imaging techniques today.

== Early life and education ==
Köhler was born in 1866 in Darmstadt, Germany, where he attended the Ludwig-Georgs-Gymnasium until 1884. He studied at the Technical University in Darmstadt and at the universities of Heidelberg and Giessen covering a wide range of fields from zoology and botany to mineralogy, physics, and chemistry.

== Teaching and academic career ==
In 1888, August Köhler graduated with a teaching degree and subsequently taught at gymnasiums in Darmstadt and Bingen before going back to university. He started his academic career as a student, instructor and assistant to professor J.W. Spengel at the Zoological Institute at the university of Giessen, Germany. The object of his doctorate thesis was the taxonomy of limpets, a project that depended heavily on microscopic imaging and prompted Köhler into trying to improve the quality of images taken via photomicrography. The result of this work was published in 1893.

After receiving his doctorate degree from the University of Giessen in 1893, Köhler worked a number of years as a grammar school teacher in Bingen. In 1900, he was invited to join the Zeiss Optical Works company in Jena, Germany, by Siegfried Czapski based on his earlier work on improving microscope illumination. He stayed with Zeiss as a physicist for 45 years and became instrumental to the development of modern light microscope design. From 1922 until his retirement in June 1945, he was also professor for microphotometry at the University of Jena. He became honorary professor of the Medical Faculty at the University of Jena in 1922 and received an honorary medical doctor degree in 1934. In 1938, he assumed the head position for the Department of Microscopy, Microphotography and Projection.

== Köhler illumination ==
At the time of the invention of his revolutionary illumination scheme as a graduate student at the University of Giessen, Köhler was working on overcoming problems with microphotography. Microscopes were illuminated by gas lamps, mirrors or other primitive light sources, resulting in an uneven specimen illumination unsuited for producing good quality photomicrographs using the slow-speed emulsions available at the time. Over the course of his work for his doctorate degree, Köhler developed a microscope configuration that allowed for an evenly illuminated field of view and reduced optical glare from the light source. It involved a collector lens for the lamp that allowed the light source to be focused on the front aperture of the condenser. This in turn allowed the condenser to be focused on the specimen using a field diaphragm and condenser focus control. This superior illumination scheme is still widely used in modern microscopes and forms the basis for phase contrast, differential interference contrast, epifluorescence, and confocal microscopy.

Köhler's groundbreaking work on microscope illumination was published in the Zeitschrift für wissenschaftliche Mikroskopie in 1893 in Germany, followed by an English summary of his work in the Journal of the Royal Microscopical Society one year later. Its significance was not noted until several years later when Köhler was invited to join the Carl Zeiss AG company based on his invention. A century after its first publication, a translation of Köhler's original article, A New System of Illumination for Photomicrographic Purposes, was reprinted in the Köhler Illumination Centenary commemorative issue by the Royal Microscopical Society in 1994. Today, the Köhler illumination is considered one of the most important principles in achieving the best optical resolution on a light microscope.

== Other contributions to microscope development ==
When Köhler joined Zeiss in 1900, Ernst Abbe and glass specialist Otto Schott had already paved the way for microscope improvements through their contributions to precise optical theory and the development of appropriate glass formulas. Köhler's expertise and his illumination technique helped to improve the microscope optics to achieve optimum resolution, using the entire resolving power of Abbe's objectives.

Köhler remained an active staff member of Zeiss for 45 years, contributing numerous innovations during this time. These include the development of a microscope operating with ultraviolet light (together with his colleague Moritz von Rohr), pioneering what would become the starting point for fluorescence microscopy, and the discovery of grid illumination, a method that would later be used in the treatment of tumors. A suggestion by Köhler led to the development of parfocal lenses which allow the specimen to remain in focus when changing objectives on a microscope.

== Patents and publications ==
As a member of Zeiss, August Köhler filed at least 25 patent applications in Europe as well as at least ten patents in the USA. His patents include projection methods and illumination for kinematographs, microscope applications, and light and dark field illumination, among others. He filed an application for a fixed-ocular microscope of his design in Germany on 16 April 1924, and with the United States Patent Office on 31 March 1925 (patent number 1649068). His publications include essays on microscopy and projection systems, and in particular his specialty of microphotography. His contributions to biology include fine structure analyses of diatoms.
