= Bernardaud =

Manufacturer of Limoges porcelain

- Founded: 1863; 163 years ago in Limoges
- Headquarters: Limoges, France
- Products: Limoges porcelain
- Number of employees: 330 (2011)
- Website: www.bernardaud.com

Bernardaud is a French family business that manufactures Limoges porcelain. The company is chaired by Michel Bernardaud, fourth generation of the Bernardaud family. The Bernardaud company has been a member of the Comité Colbert since 1964.

== History ==
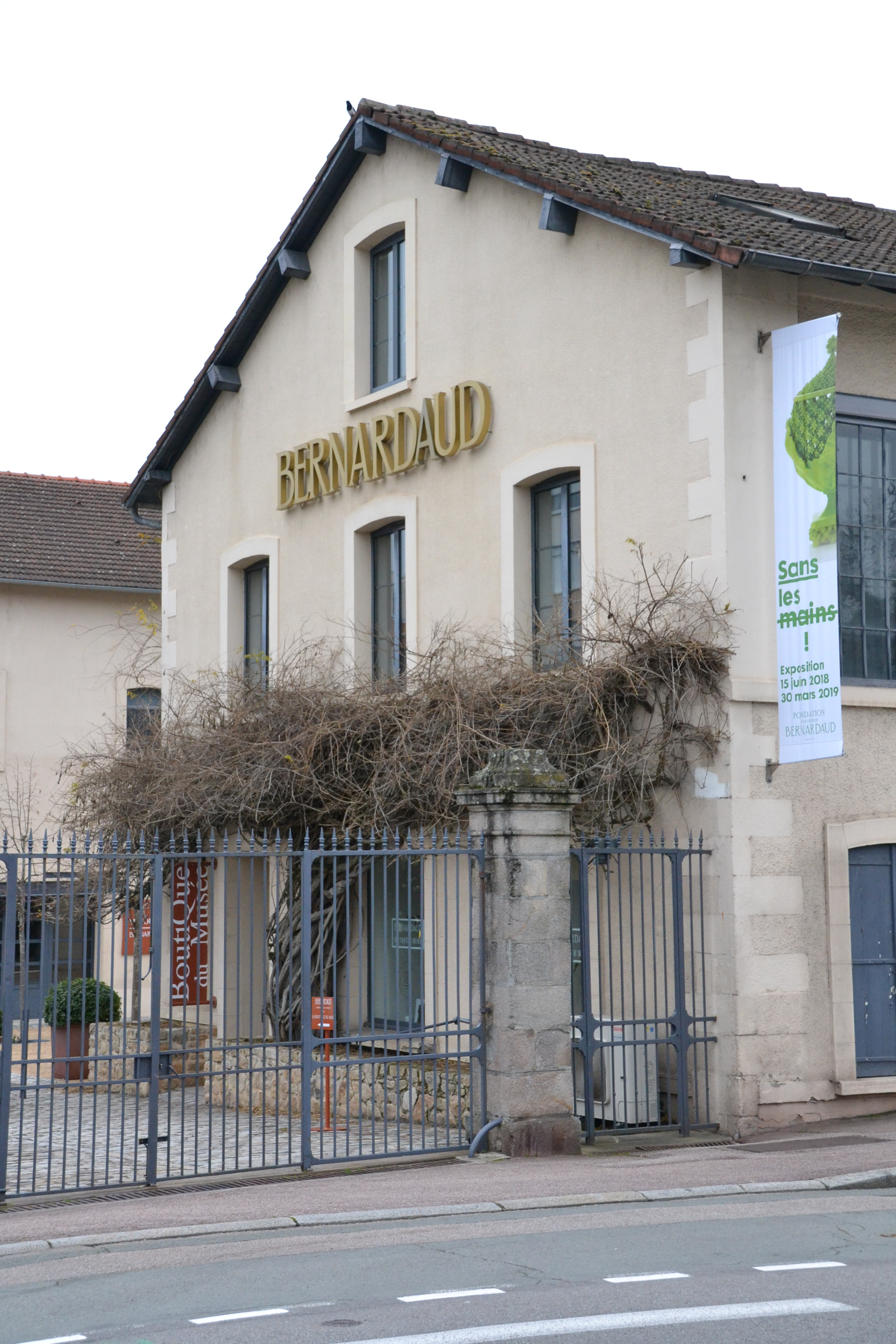
Partial view of the historic factory in Limoges

=== First generation ===
In the 1890s, Léonard Bernardaud (1856-1923) collaborated with Rémi Delinières who ran a porcelain factory in Limoges, a company operating since 1863 on a street which is now Avenue Albert-Thomas. The R. Delinières et Cie factory produces porcelain under the brand (under enamel) D & Co / FRANCE 6. In 1895, Léonard Bernardaud became a partner in the company R. Delinières & Cie 7, then the latter was dissolved in 1900 and replaced by the new company L. Bernardaud & Cie.

L. Bernardaud & Cie established a sales system without intermediaries with American customers and by setting up an office in New York in 1911. In 1923, the year of his death, he passed on his business to his two sons, Jacques Bernardaud (1888-) and Michel Bernardaud (1896-1949).

=== Second generation ===
Under the direction of Jacques and Michel Bernardaud, the porcelain factory developed its activities; pieces in the Art Deco style of the time, were presented in major international exhibitions, such as in Paris, in 1925, 1931, and 1937; the company maintained its activity during difficult periods, such as the crisis of 1929 and World War II. After the war, modern manufacturing techniques were put in place, such as in 1949, a gas-powered Hoffmann kiln. In 1950, Jacques Bernardaud was alone at the head of the company, after the death, in 1949, of his brother Michel. A painter himself, he cultivated relationships with the artists of his time and expanded the manufactory's collections.

The Bernardaud company continued to develop under a financing policy consisting of capital increases and the use of loans.

=== Third generation ===
In 1962, management of the factory was entrusted to Michel Bernardaud's son, Pierre Bernardaud (1928-1994). Paul Bernardaud, the son of Jacques Bernardaud, worked alongside his cousin.

In 1967, the company called on the master of industrial design Raymond Loewy to create the first contemporary service in Limoges porcelain. It also entered the era of mass communication and launched its first television advertising campaign. In 1970, Bernardaud bought the Vignaud factory, located on rue du Chinchauvaud, in Limoges; this acquisition made it possible to increase the production of porcelain considerably.

=== Fourth generation ===
Michel Bernardaud (1957-), son of Pierre Bernardaud, joined the family business in 1979 and became general manager in 1986. In 1994, he was appointed by the company's board of directors to take over as head of the firm, of his father who died in a helicopter accident in Vietnam in March 1994.

In 1986, the Ancienne Manufacture Royale company (historically the Manufacture Royale de Limoges) became part of the Bernardaud group. In the 1990s, Bernardaud went international, while asserting its roots: the Limoges factory was rehabilitated and became a center of culture and reception open to the public and artists. The Bernardaud Foundation was created in 2003

Michel Bernardaud carries out the porcelain activity of his company by continuing in the way opened by his father; it continues to modernize the production sites dedicated to the manufacture of porcelain; he is active in the launch of advertising campaigns aimed at attracting the public's attention to the porcelain objects created by his company; he maintains the emphasis placed on creation in the profession of porcelain maker.

== Description ==
The company employed 330 people in 2011. It received the living heritage company label and one of its workshop managers was named Meilleur Ouvrier de France. It offers guided tours all year round.

The company also develops high-tech ceramics used, for example, to armour cars or bullet-proof vests.

== Commemorations ==
In 2019, rue de Genève in Limoges was renamed rue Pierre Bernardaud.

== See also ==
- List of porcelain manufacturers
- Porcelain manufacturing companies in Europe

== Bibliography ==
- Jean d'Albis; Céleste Romanet (1980). La porcelaine de Limoges. Paris: Éditions Sous le Vent. ISBN 978-2858890255.
- Michel Bernardaud (2006). Porcelaine. Beaux arts. Jean-Christophe Ballot. Paris: Agnès Vienot Éditions. ISBN 978-2914645799. BNF: 40104421.
- Edmond Blanc (1944). Au royaume de la porcelaine: visite d'une fabrique de porcelaine : la fabrique Bernardaud. Paris: imprimerie de Charles-Lavauzelle. BNF: 31822408.
