= Culinary Institute Lenôtre =

French-owned culinary college in Houston, Texas

Coordinates: 29.8236°N 95.3786°W

- Type: Private culinary school
- Established: 1998
- Founders: Alain Lenotre, Marie Lenotre
- Affiliations: ACF, World Association of Chefs' Societies
- President: Alain Lenotre
- Students: ~300
- Location: Houston, Texas, United States
- Campus: Urban
- Colors: Blue and Red
- Website: culinaryinstitute.edu

The Culinary Institute Lenotre (CIL) is a French-owned Culinary College in the US located in Houston, Texas, and was founded in 1998 by Alain Lenotre, son of the acclaimed French pastry chef Gaston Lenôtre (1920–2009), and his wife, Marie Lenotre.

The school is specialized in culinary arts, baking and pastry arts, hotel and restaurant management and Sommelier. The institute offers associate degrees and diploma as well as continuing education programs for professional and recreational cooking classes for non-professionals.

The school also operates an onsite restaurant that doubles as a training application environment for its students: Le Bistro.

In 2017, the Culinary Institute Lenotre has been named part of the 22 Best Culinary Schools in the US by FSR Magazine. The school has been Ranked The Best College for Culinary Arts in America for 2019, 2020 and 2021 by Niche.com.

The school colors (Blue and Red) refer to the school's French Legacy.

== History ==
The Culinary Institute Lenotre was founded in September 1998 in Houston, Texas by the chef Alain Lenotre, EMBA, and his wife Marie Lenotre.

Alain Lenotre and his father, Chef Gaston Lenotre who was known as the pope of the French pastry, first created a culinary school in France in 1971 : Ecole Lenôtre Plaisir. After moving to Houston, Texas, in the early 1980s, Alain and Marie Lenotre founded the Culinary Institute Lenotre.

The institute celebrated its 100th graduation in March 2017 by holding a National Symposium on Pastry Arts

== Organization and Administration ==
The Culinary Institute Lenotre is an employee-owned school governed by an 9-member advisory board comprising Chef Charles Carroll, Sam Mendoza, Kevin Avery, Rich Popovic, Adam Perkey, Jennifer Gallagher, John Signorelli, Sean Moore, Martin Dennis, and Diane Butler. The College president is Mr. Alain Lenotre.

The Culinary Institute Lenotre's faculty number is approximately 14 academics teachers and 13 Chefs-instructors.

== Academics ==
The Culinary Institute Lenotre offers professional accredited programs and continuing education programs as well. All programs are ACF and World Association of Chefs' Societies accredited.

=== Degree programs ===
The Culinary Institute Lenotre offers 3 professional programs in Cuisine, Baking & Pastry and Hospitality & Restaurant management. Each degree programs includes a 10 weeks practicum.

=== Other programs and courses ===
The Culinary Institute Lenotre also offers non-degree seeking continuing education programs in advanced artistic skills of pastry décor, cuisine, baking & pastry or sommelier. The college also offers recreational classes for non-professional.

== Student body ==
The Culinary Institute Lenotre has approximately 300 students at all-times.

== Events ==
=== Champagne and Chocolat Gala ===
Since 2001, Marie Lenotre organizes the Champagne & Chocolat Gala to raise funds for the Gaston Lenotre Scholarship Foundation. Since 2001, the foundation has distributed over $750,000 in scholarships.

=== 2017 National Symposium on Pastry Arts ===
On 6 March 2017, the Culinary Institute Lenotre organized the 2017 Lenotre National Symposium on Pastry Arts to celebrate the 100th graduation. The event gathered approximately 120 professionals of the Pastry Arts industry to attend discussions and network. Chef Roland Mesnier, former White House Executive Pastry Chef, and Chef Charles Carroll, Past President of world of Association of Chef's society, made special speeches. Beside the speeches and discussions, an ACF accredited chocolate showpiece competition was held, eight professional competitors and 16 students competed on the theme of the 100th graduation. The first prize was won by Nicolas Blouin, a French Pastry Chef from Dallas.
