= Polarized light microscopy =

Optical microscopy techniques

Polarizing microscope operating principle

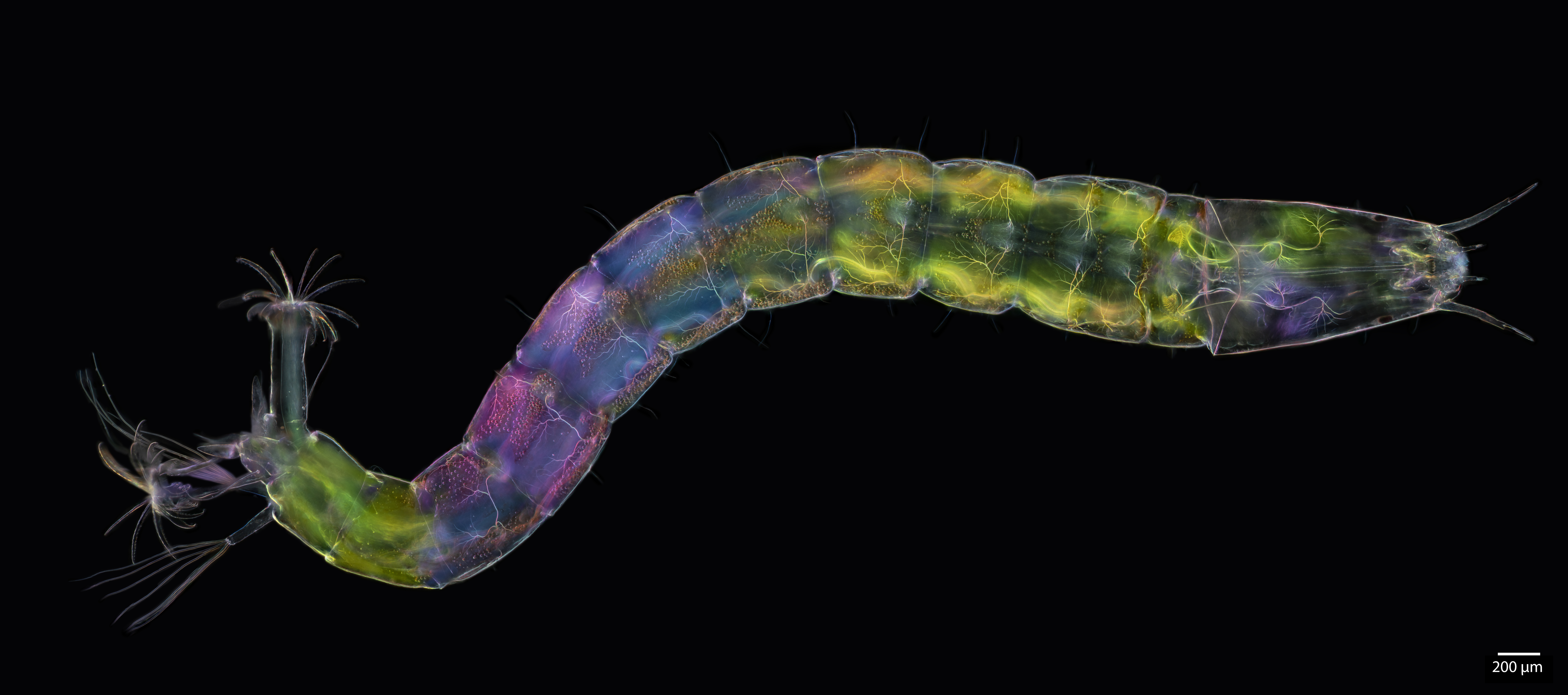
Depiction of internal organs of a midge larva via birefringence and polarized light microscopy

Polarized light microscopy can mean any of a number of optical microscopy techniques involving polarized light. Simple techniques include illumination of the sample with polarized light. Directly transmitted light can, optionally, be blocked with a polariser oriented at 90 degrees to the illumination. More complex microscopy techniques which take advantage of polarized light include differential interference contrast microscopy and interference reflection microscopy. Scientists will often use a device called a polarizing plate to convert natural light into polarized light.

These illumination techniques are most commonly used on birefringent samples where the polarized light interacts strongly with the sample and so generates contrast with the background. Polarized light microscopy is used extensively in optical mineralogy.

Although the invention of the polarizing microscope is typically attributed to David Brewster around 1815, Brewster clearly acknowledges the priority of Henry Fox Talbot, who published his work in 1834.

== See also ==
- Michel-Lévy interference colour chart
- Petrographic microscope
