= Limoges porcelain =

Porcelain produced in Limoges, France

Limoges porcelain is hard-paste porcelain produced by factories in and around the city of Limoges, France, beginning in the late 18th century, by any manufacturer. By about 1830, Limoges, which was close to the areas where suitable clay was found, had replaced Paris as the main centre for private porcelain factories, although the state-owned Sèvres porcelain near Paris remained dominant at the very top of the market. Limoges has maintained this position to the present day.

== History ==
Limoges had strong antecedents in the production of decorative objects. The city was the most famous European centre of vitreous enamel production in the 12th century, and Limoges enamel was known as Opus de Limogia or Labor Limogiae.

Limoges had also been the site of a minor industry producing plain faience earthenware since the 1730s.

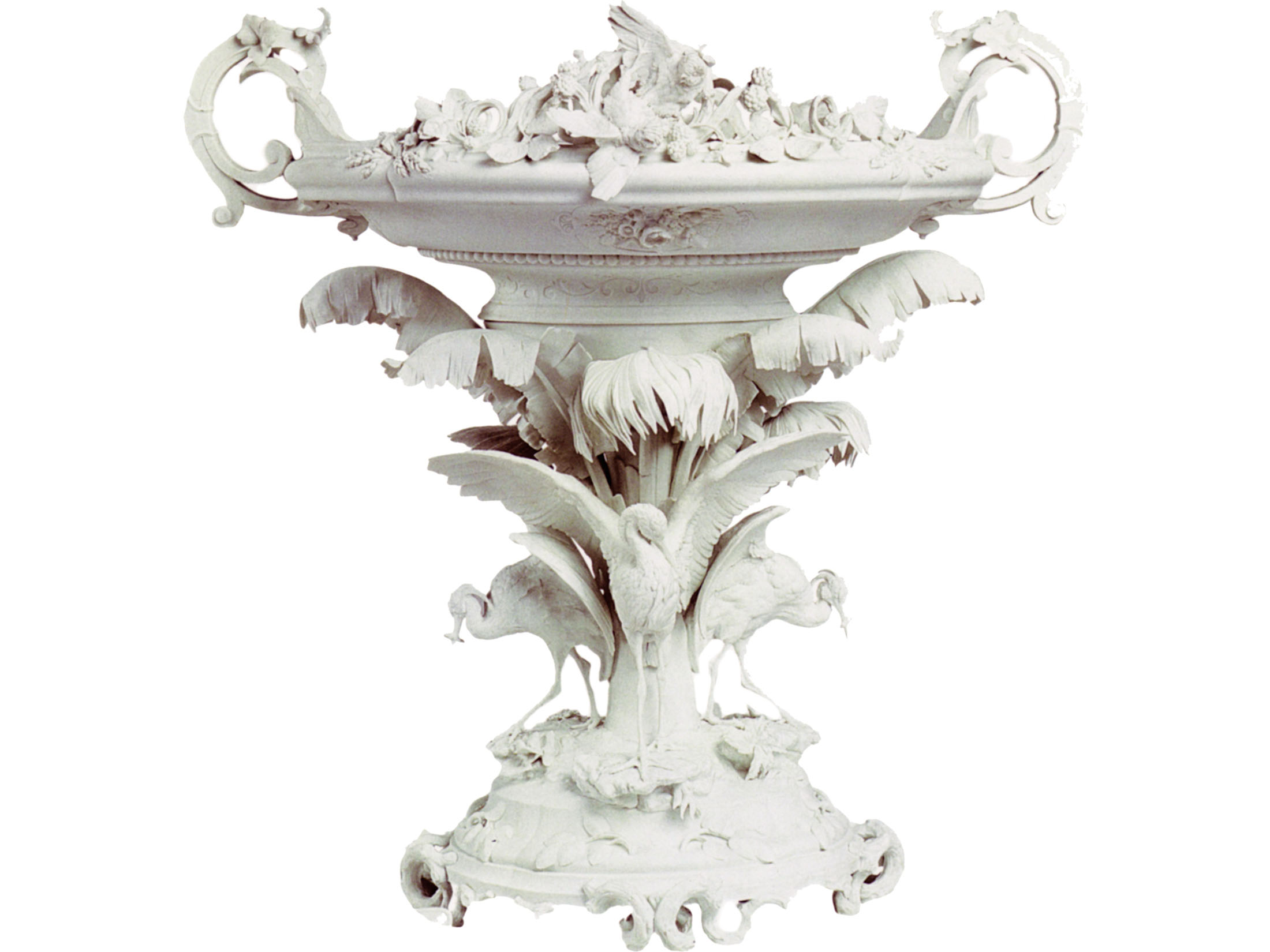
Bisque porcelain centrepiece for the Exposition Universelle of 1855, Pouyat factory

Origins and raw materials: The manufacturing of hard-paste porcelain at Limoges began in 1771 under the direction of Anne-Robert-Jacques Turgot, the Intendant of Limoges. This followed the 1768 discovery of kaolin and petuntse-like deposits at Saint-Yrieix-la-Perche, a village south of the city. These minerals allowed for the production of porcelain similar to Chinese imports. Quarrying of the local materials started in 1768 to support the first production trials.

Royal ownership: The Limoges manufactory was initially placed under the patronage of the Comte d'Artois, brother of Louis XVI. In 1784, the king purchased the factory. The royal administration intended for the Limoges site to process local clay and produce white hard-paste bodies for decoration at the Sèvres manufactory near Paris. However, this plan was not implemented due to administrative and political difficulties.

Private industry and expansion: The French Revolution ended royal monopolies on porcelain production, which led to the opening of several private factories in the Haute-Vienne region. Growth in Limoges was supported by the local kaolin supplies and the Limousin forests which provided fuel for the kilns.

In the 19th century, several large firms were established. Royal Limoges, founded in 1797, is the oldest porcelain factory in the city still in operation. In 1842, David Haviland founded Haviland & Co. to produce designs for the United States market. Another firm, Bernardaud, was established in 1863. By the late 19th century, Limoges was the main centre for French porcelain manufacturing.

== Present day ==
Limoges maintains the position it established in the 19th century as the premier manufacturing city of porcelain in France.

Counterfeiting of Limoges porcelain has been documented for decades.

== Protected status ==
The legal definition of Limoges porcelain is strictly regulated by French and European law to protect its authenticity and heritage. It does not refer to a single company or brand, such as Haviland or Bernardaud, but is instead defined by its precise geographical origin and strict manufacturing standards.

According to the legal Geographical Indication approved by France's National Institute of Industrial Property under number INPI-1702, and recognised by the European Union, Limoges porcelain is defined as porcelain products that are entirely manufactured and decorated within the geographical area of the Haute-Vienne department in France. To legally bear the Limoges or Porcelaine de Limoges stamp, a piece cannot simply be made in Limoges and shipped elsewhere to be painted, nor can blanks be imported from abroad to be decorated in Limoges.

The entire production process, encompassing everything from shaping the clay body to the final firing and decoration, must take place within this specific region by a certified operator.

== See also ==
- Porcelain manufacturing companies in Europe
