= Bertrandite =

Sorosilicate mineral

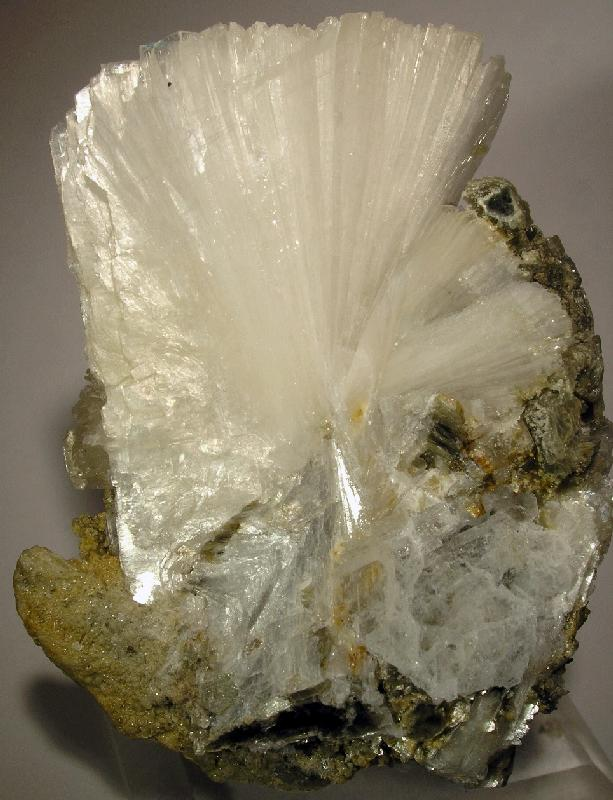
- Bertrandite from the Golconda pegmatite, Minas Gerais, Brazil

General
- Category: Sorosilicate
- Formula: Be_{4}Si_{2}O_{7}(OH)_{2}
- IMA symbol: Btd
- Strunz classification: 9.BD.05
- Crystal system: Orthorhombic
- Crystal class: Pyramidal (mm2); H-M symbol: (mm2)
- Space group: Ccm2_{1}
- Unit cell: a = 8.7135(4) Å, b = 15.268(1) Å, c = 4.5683(3) Å; Z = 4

Identification
- Color: Colorless to pale yellow
- Crystal habit: Thin tabular, prismatic to needle-like crystals commonly in radial clusters
- Twinning: Common on {011} or {021} forming heart- or V-shaped twins
- Cleavage: Perfect on {001}; distinct on {100}, {010} and {110}
- Mohs scale hardness: 6–7
- Luster: Vitreous, pearly on cleavage surfaces
- Diaphaneity: Transparent
- Specific gravity: 2.59–2.60
- Optical properties: Biaxial (−)
- Refractive index: n_{α} = 1.591 n_{β} = 1.605 n_{γ} = 1.614
- Birefringence: δ = 0.023
- 2V angle: Measured: 73° to 81°

Bertrandite is a beryllium sorosilicate hydroxide mineral with composition: Be_{4}Si_{2}O_{7}(OH)_{2}. Bertrandite is a colorless to pale yellow orthorhombic mineral with a hardness of 6–7.

It is commonly found in beryllium rich pegmatites and is in part an alteration of beryl. Bertrandite often occurs as a pseudomorphic replacement of beryl. Associated minerals include beryl, phenakite, herderite, tourmaline, muscovite, fluorite and quartz.

It, with beryl, are ores of beryllium.

It was discovered near Nantes, France in 1883 and named after French mineralogist, Emile Bertrand (1844–1909).

One of the world's largest deposits of bertrandite is Spor Mountain, Thomas Range, Utah which is currently the source of most of the world's beryllium production.

== See also ==
- List of minerals
- List of minerals named after people
