= Micrograph =

Process for producing pictures with a microscope

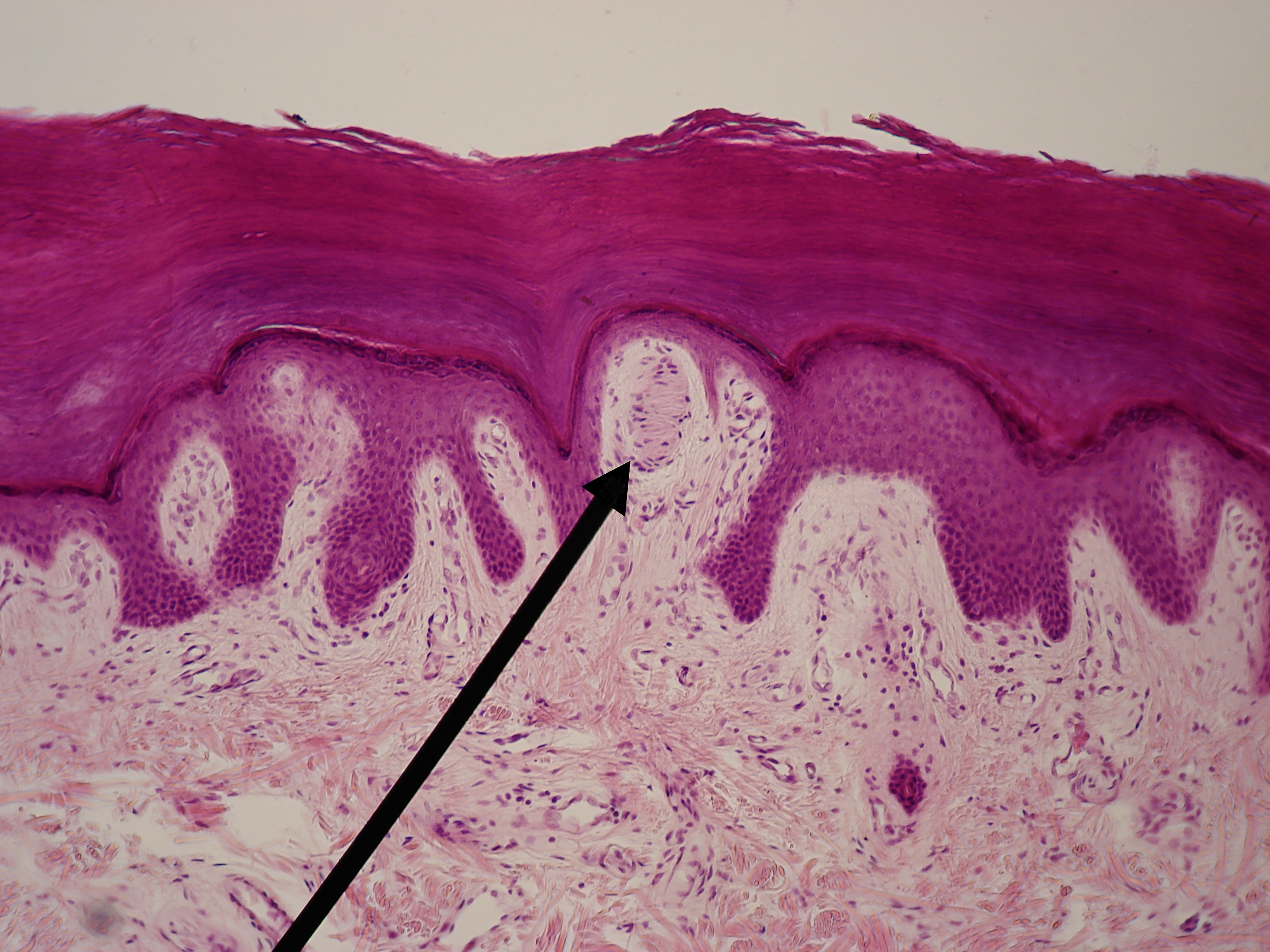
100× light micrograph of Meissner's corpuscle at the tip of a dermal papillus

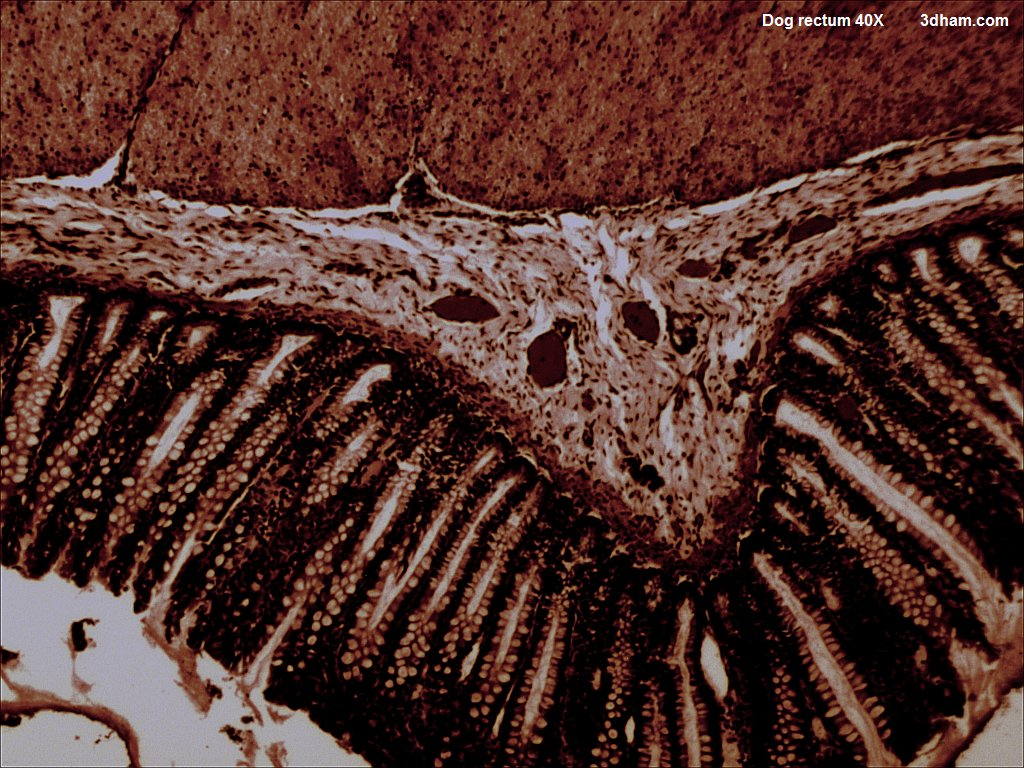
40× micrograph of a canine rectum cross section

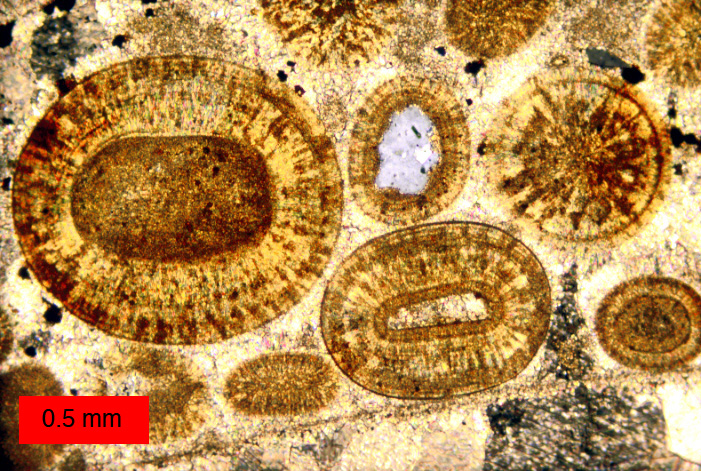
A photomicrograph of a thin section of a limestone with ooids. The largest is approximately 1.2 mm in diameter. The red object in the lower left is a scale bar indicating relative size.

Approximately 10× micrograph of a doubled die on a coin, where the date was punched twice in the die used to strike the coin

A micrograph is an image, captured photographically or digitally, taken through a microscope or similar device to show a magnified image of an object. This is opposed to a macrograph or photomacrograph, an image which is also taken on a microscope but is only slightly magnified, usually less than 10 times. Micrography is the practice or art of using microscopes to make photographs. A photographic micrograph is a photomicrograph, and one taken with an electron microscope is an electron micrograph.

A micrograph contains extensive details of microstructure. A wealth of information can be obtained from a simple micrograph like behavior of the material under different conditions, the phases found in the system, failure analysis, grain size estimation, elemental analysis and so on. Micrographs are widely used in all fields of microscopy.

== Types ==
=== Photomicrograph ===
A light micrograph or photomicrograph is a micrograph prepared using an optical microscope, a process referred to as photomicroscopy. At a basic level, photomicroscopy may be performed simply by connecting a camera to a microscope, thereby enabling the user to take photographs at reasonably high magnification.

Scientific use began in England in 1850 by Richard Hill Norris FRSE for his studies of blood cells.

Roman Vishniac was a pioneer in the field of photomicroscopy, specializing in the photography of living creatures in full motion. He also made major developments in light-interruption photography and color photomicroscopy.

Photomicrographs may also be obtained using a USB microscope attached directly to a home computer or laptop.

=== Electron micrograph ===
An electron micrograph is a micrograph prepared using an electron microscope.

== Magnification and micron bars ==
Micrographs usually have micron bars, or magnification ratios, or both.

Magnification is a ratio between the size of an object on a picture and its real size. Magnification can be a misleading parameter as it depends on the final size of a printed picture and therefore varies with picture size. A scale bar, or micron bar, is a line of known length displayed on a picture. The bar can be used for measurements on a picture. When the picture is resized the bar is also resized making it possible to recalculate the magnification. Ideally, all pictures destined for publication/presentation should be supplied with a scale bar; the magnification ratio is optional. All but one (limestone) of the micrographs presented on this page do not have a micron bar; supplied magnification ratios are likely incorrect, as they were not calculated for pictures at the present size.

== Micrography as art ==
The microscope has been mainly used for scientific discovery. It has also been linked to the arts since its invention in the 17th century. Early adopters of the microscope, such as Robert Hooke and Antonie van Leeuwenhoek, were excellent illustrators. Cornelius Varley's graphic microscope made sketching from a microscope easier with a camera-lucida-like mechanism. After the invention of photography in the 1820s the microscope was later combined with the camera to take pictures instead of relying on an artistic rendering.

Since the early 1970s individuals have been using the microscope as an artistic instrument. Websites and traveling art exhibits such as the Nikon Small World and Olympus Bioscapes have featured a range of images for the sole purpose of artistic enjoyment. Some collaborative groups, such as the Paper Project have also incorporated microscopic imagery into tactile art pieces as well as 3D immersive rooms and dance performances.

In 2015, photographer and gemologist Danny J. Sanchez photographed mineral and gemstone interiors in works referred to as "otherworldly".

== Photomicrography in smartphones ==
A paper published in 2009 described a method of photomicrography in a smartphone using a free-hand technique. An operator only needs focus the camera through the eyepiece of a microscope and capture a photo normally. Later, adapters were designed for the purpose and sold commercially or home-made. A home-made adapter was also made using scrap materials and a Coca-Cola aluminum can.

== Gallery ==
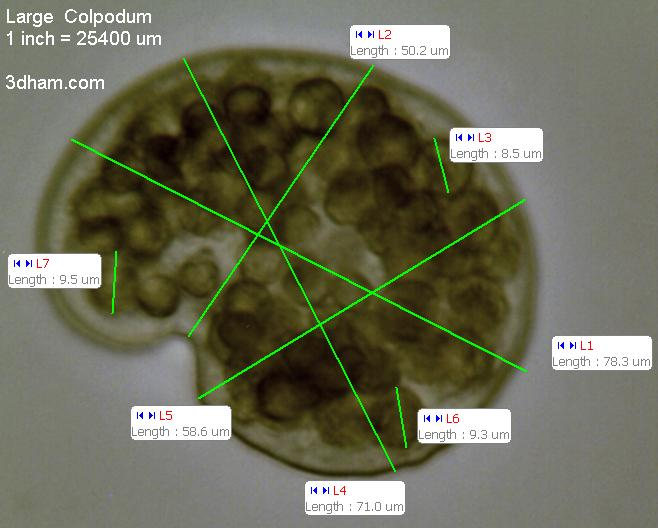
Measurements of a large Colpoda at 400×

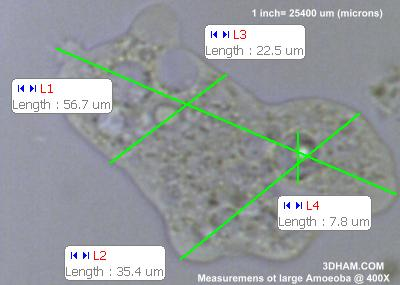
Measurements of a large amoeba at 400×

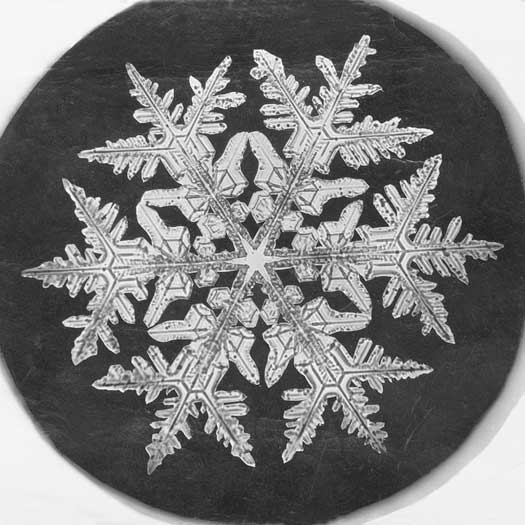
Snowflake micrograph by Wilson Bentley, 1890

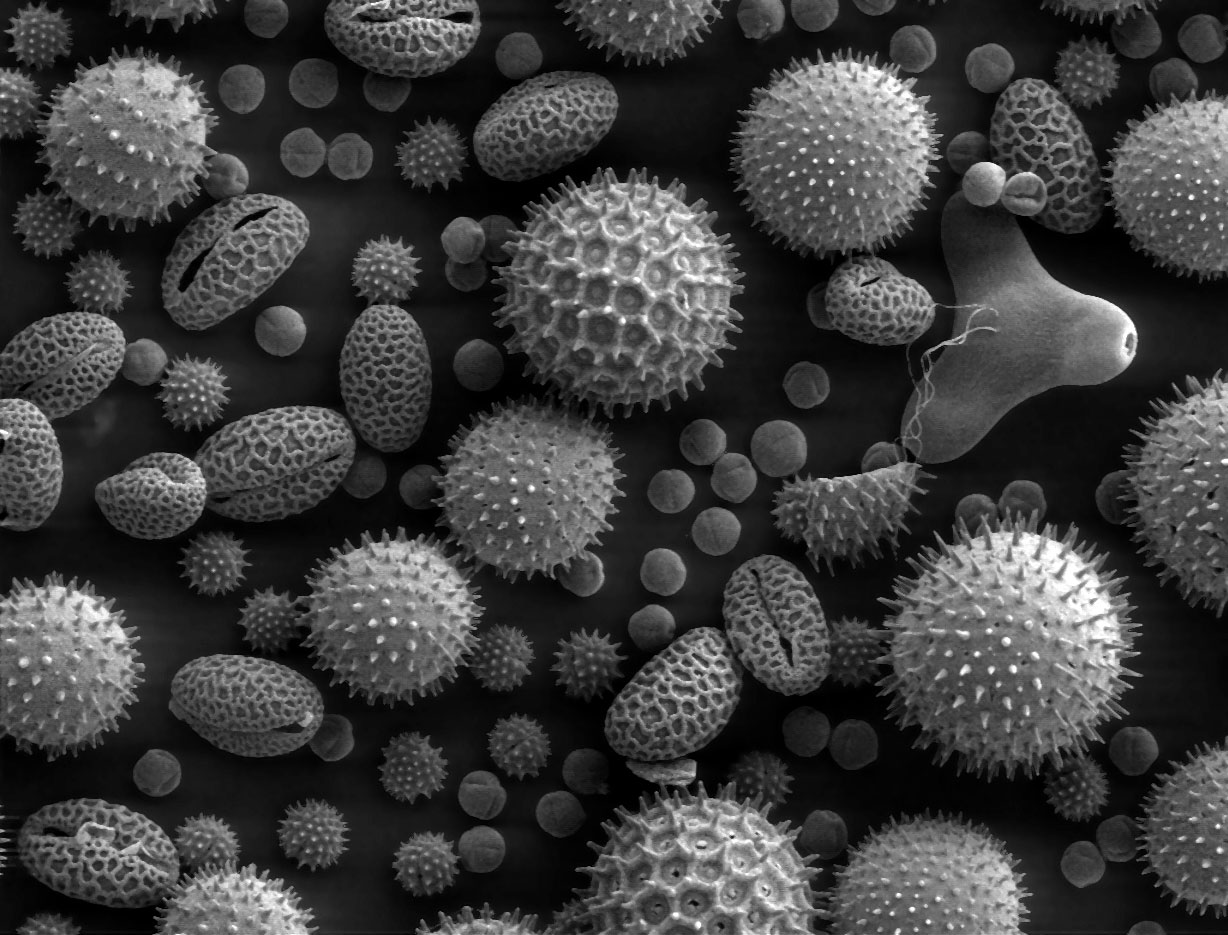
An image of pollen taken from a scanning electron microscope

== See also ==
- Close-up
- Digital microscope
- Macro photography
- Microphotograph
- Microscopy
- USB microscope
