= Hirox =

Japanese manufacturer of digital microscopes

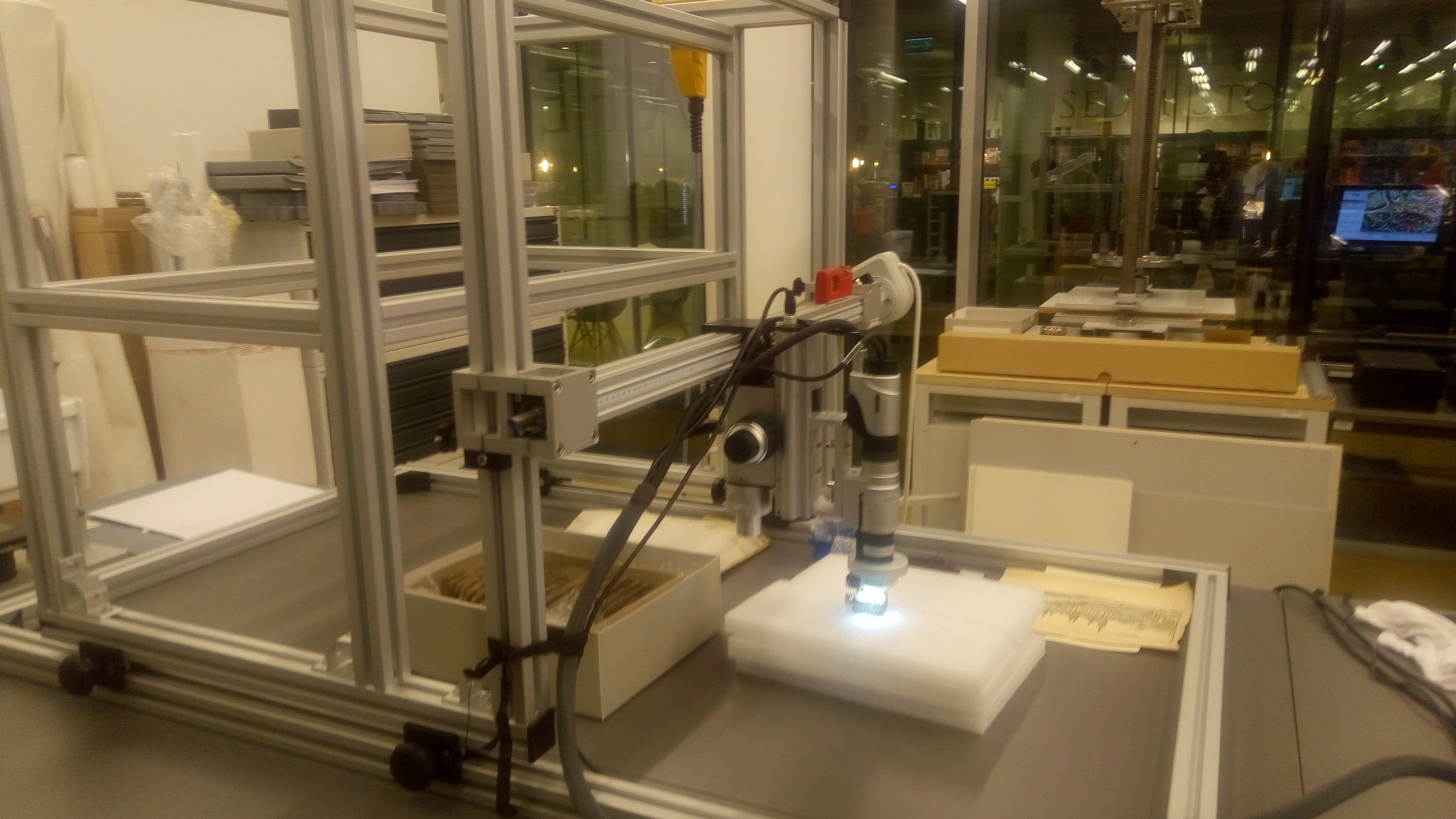
Hirox RH-2000 digital microscope

Hirox (ハイロックス) is a lens company in Tokyo, Japan that created the first digital microscope in 1985. This company is now known as Hirox Co Ltd. Hirox's main industry is digital microscopes, but still makes the lenses for a variety of items including rangefinders.

Hirox's newest digital microscope systems are currently as of 2019 the RH-2000 and the RH-8800. The RH-2000 connects to a desktop computer by USB 3.0 and USB 2.0. The RH-8800 system is a standalone system with the computer built-in. Both are capable of 3D rotation, high dynamic range, 2D and 3D measurement, 2D and 3D tiling, as well as automated particle counting.

== History ==
Hirox founded in Tokyo, Japan in 1978 as a lens and optical system manufacturer. In 1980 the company started to design and sell TV lenses for people with poor eyesight, and to supply products to the Swedish government. It introduced the first digital microscope in 1985, followed by a hand-held video microscope system in 1986, supplied to the Japanese police force. The Hirox Digital Microscope System started distribution in the USA in 1986. The 3-D rotational microscope was introduced in 1992. From 2000 offices and associated companies were set up in Osaka, USA, China, Nagoya, Korea, Europe, and Asia, with distribution agreements with LECO (USA), Leeds Precision Instruments, and Olympus Corporation.

By 2014 distribution agreements with LECO (USA), Leeds Precision Instruments, and Olympus Corporation had ended.

In 2018, a distribution agreement started with Nikon Metrology.

One of the first major demonstrations of the Hirox technology was the high-resolution digitalization of Girl with a Pearl Earring starting in 2018, resulting in a panoramic image of over 1 billion pixels, believed to be first such panoramic image of this size.

== Digital microscope magnification ==
The Hirox Digital Microscope System supports magnifications of up to 7000×. A primary difference between an optical and a digital microscope is the magnification. With an optical microscope the magnification is the lens magnification multiplied by the eyepiece magnification. The magnification for a digital microscope is defined as the ratio of the size of image on the monitor to the subject size. The Hirox Digital Microscope System has a 15" monitor.

== Optical and digital microscopes ==
Since the digital microscope has the image projected directly on to the CCD camera, it is possible to have higher quality recorded images than with an optical microscope. With the optical microscope, the lenses are designed for the optics of the eye. Attaching a CCD camera to an optical microscope will result in an image that has compromises due to the eyepiece.

== 2D measurement ==
The Hirox Digital Microscope System can measure distances on-screen. Calibration is needed at each magnification.

== 3D measurement ==
3D measurement is achieved with a digital microscope by image stacking. Using a step motor, the system takes images from the lowest focal plane in the field of view to the highest focal plane. Then it reconstructs these images into a 3D model based on contrast to give a 3D color image of the sample. From these 3D model measurements can be made, but their accuracy is based on the step motor and depth of field of the lens. The step motor is necessary to get accurate height information and accuracy is higher with a shallower depth of field. The most accurate 3D measurement from a step motor for a digital microscope is 1 micrometres. The 3D measurement abilities include, but are not limited to height, length, angle, radius, volume and area. Also, the 3D model can be shown as a texture model, wireframe, or rainbow graph. This data can be exported to be viewed on a PC or in programs such as MATLAB.

== 2D and 3D tiling ==
2D and 3D tiling, also known as stitching or creating a panoramic image, can be done with the more advanced digital microscope systems. In 2D tiling images are automatically tiled together seamlessly in real-time by moving the XY stage. 3D tiling combines the XY-stage movement of 2D-tiling with the Z-axis movement of 3D measurement to create a 3D panoramic.

== See also ==
- Microscope
- Digital microscope
- High dynamic range
- Optical microscope
