= USB microscope =

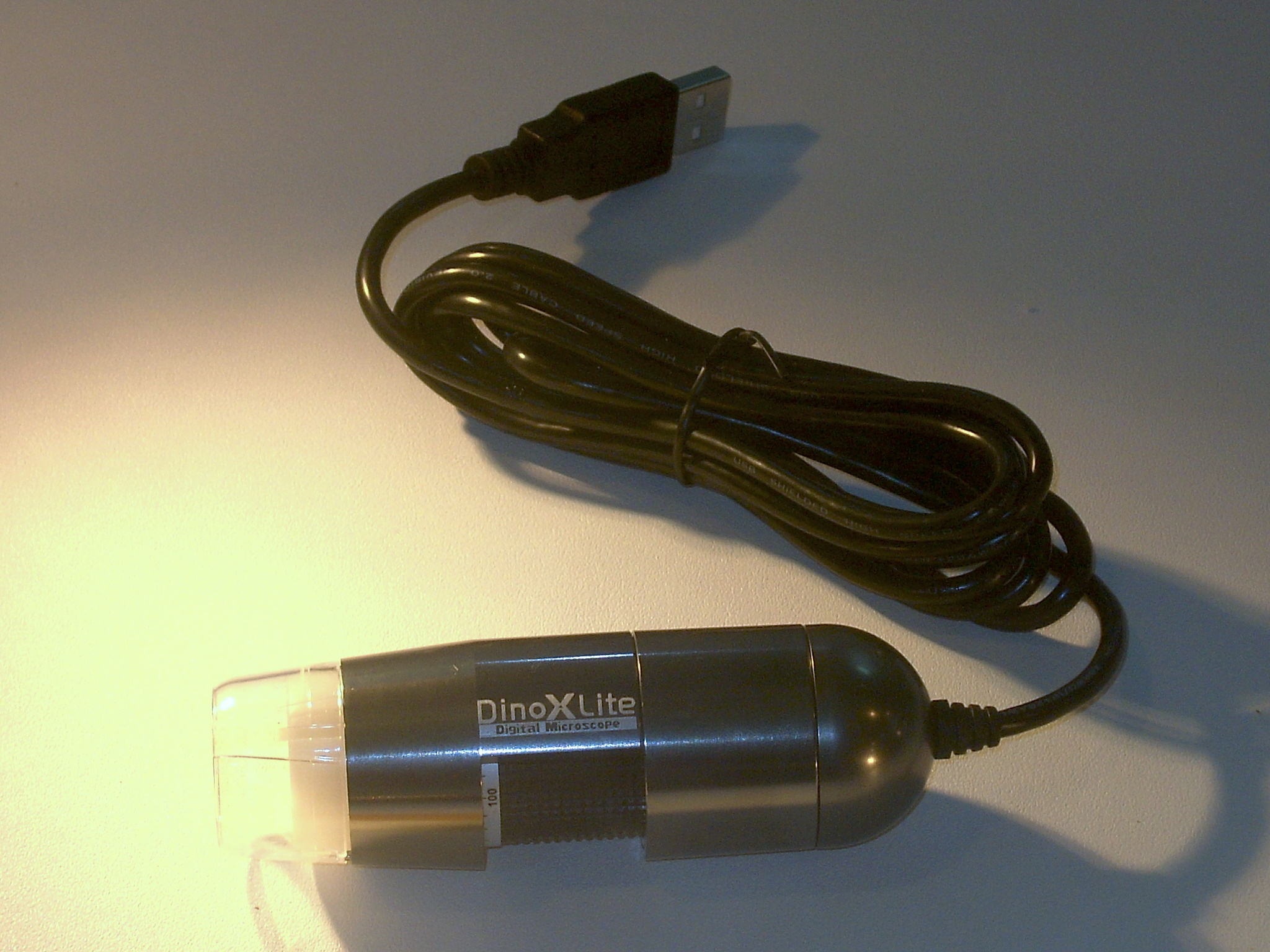
A miniature USB microscope with inbuilt LED lights next to the lens at left.

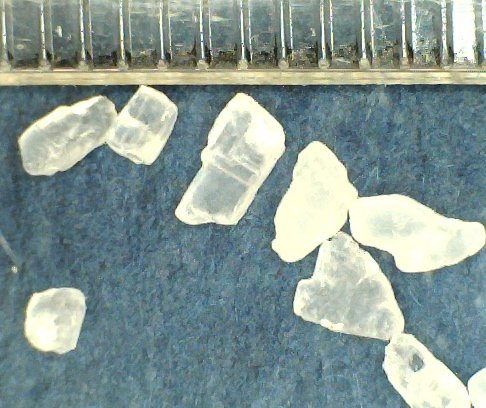
Sea salt crystals seen with a USB microscope.

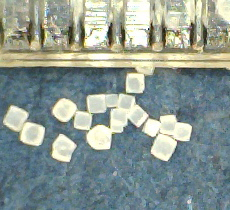
Table salt crystals seen with a USB microscope.

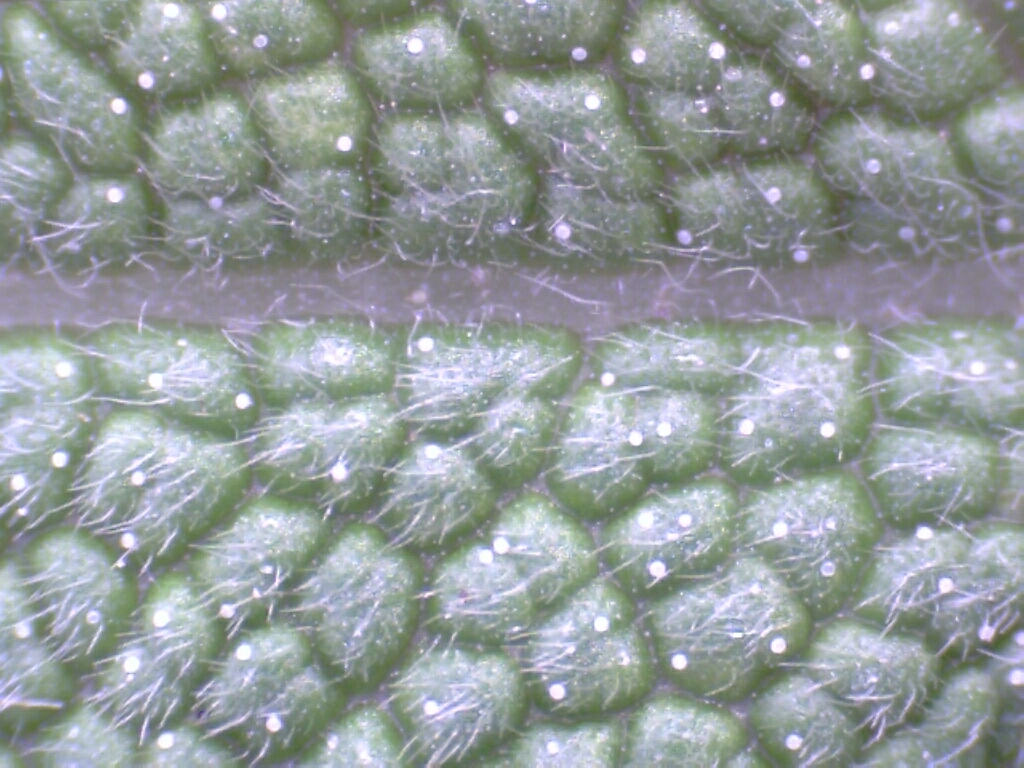
The top side of a sage leaf seen with a USB microscope - trichomes are visible.

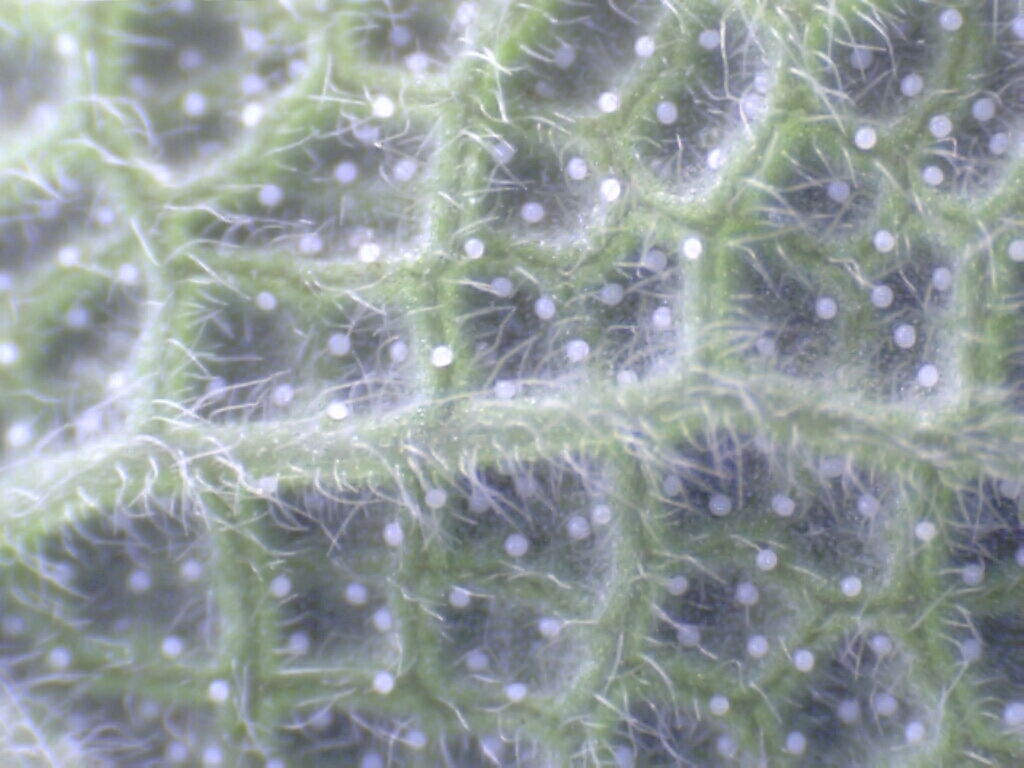
The USB image of the underside of a sage leaf - more trichomes are visible on this side.

A USB microscope is a low-powered digital microscope which connects to a computer's USB port. Microscopes essentially the same as USB models are also available with other interfaces either in addition to or instead of USB, such as via WiFi. They are widely available at low cost for use at home or in commerce. Their cost varies in the range of tens to thousands of dollars. In essence, a USB microscope is a webcam with a high-powered macro lens, and generally uses reflected rather than transmitted light, using built-in LED light sources surrounding the lens. The camera is usually sensitive enough not to need additional illumination beyond normal ambient lighting. The camera attaches directly to the USB port of a computer without the need for an eyepiece, and the images are shown directly on the computer's display.

They usually provide modest magnifications (about 1× to 200×) without the need to use eyepieces, at cost very much lower than conventional stereomicroscopes. The quality of the final image depends on the lens and sensor quality, resolution—which may range from 1.3 megapixels to 5 MP or more—operator skill, and illumination quality. Both still images and videos can be recorded on most systems.

== Usage ==
Images can be recorded and stored on a computer in the same way as with a webcam. The camera is usually fitted with a light source, although extra sources (such as a fiber-optic light) can be used to highlight features of interest in the object. They generally offer a large depth of field and a range of magnification when examining the image on the computer. The camera is usually sufficiently sensitive to generate an image with normal ambient lighting, without the need for an extra light source.

USB microscopes are most useful when examining flat objects such as coins, printed circuit boards, or documents such as banknotes, but can be used on surfaces of irregular shape such as fibres owing to the high depth of field. Their use is generally similar to that of a reflection optical microscope or a stereo microscope. USB microscopes are much less bulky than conventional stereo microscopes. They are useful in examining large items in situ where use of a conventional microscope is impractical.

Simple ways in which the microscope can be used is a comparison of salt crystals, such as sea salt and table salt. A common millimeter scale at the tops of the micrographs show the smaller size of the cubic table salt crystals. The good depth of field available is shown by USB micrographs of a sage leaf.

Such devices are useful in forensic engineering where large fracture surfaces need direct examination, an application where conventional light microscopes are restricted in use. They are normally handheld for this application, but can also be mounted in a small stand.

USB microscopes are used in crime scene investigation units. As they do not come into contact with the object viewed, sensitive crime scene evidence is not contaminated.

They also find use in medical application such as ENT examinations.

== Endoscopy ==
Related devices include a USB endoscope, where the digital camera is fitted to a long length of cable and enables the camera to be used to inspect cavities which are otherwise difficult to examine (such as car engine interiors, pipe interiors, sewers and so on). As with the microscope, the cable is fitted with a USB plug to engage with the PC. Alternatively, a simple USB device can be fitted to a conventional endoscope. Endoscopes with a small screen are also available, allowing the user to see the hidden scene directly without the use of a laptop computer.

Since this area of technology is still developing very rapidly, further design and technical improvements as well as lower prices may be expected in the near future (in February 2016, there were units costing less than $10 offered on internet sites). The software used for image manipulation already offers big improvements in capability, allowing the digital images to be cropped and brightness and image contrast changed as needed, for example. Accessories such as polarizers are expensive but allow extra control of unwanted specular reflections from the subject, for example.

== Effective magnification ==
The precise magnification is determined by the working distance between the camera and the object, and good supports are needed to control the image, especially at higher magnifications. The magnifying abilities of these instruments are often overstated; typically offering 200× magnification, this claim is based usually on 25× to 30× actual magnification which is then further magnified by the expansion of the image by display on the screen. High magnifications are available only if the camera has a high resolution, so the image from a 5-megapixel camera can be enlarged to a greater extent than that from a 2-megapixel camera, for example.
