= Digital microscope =

Microscope that outputs a digital image

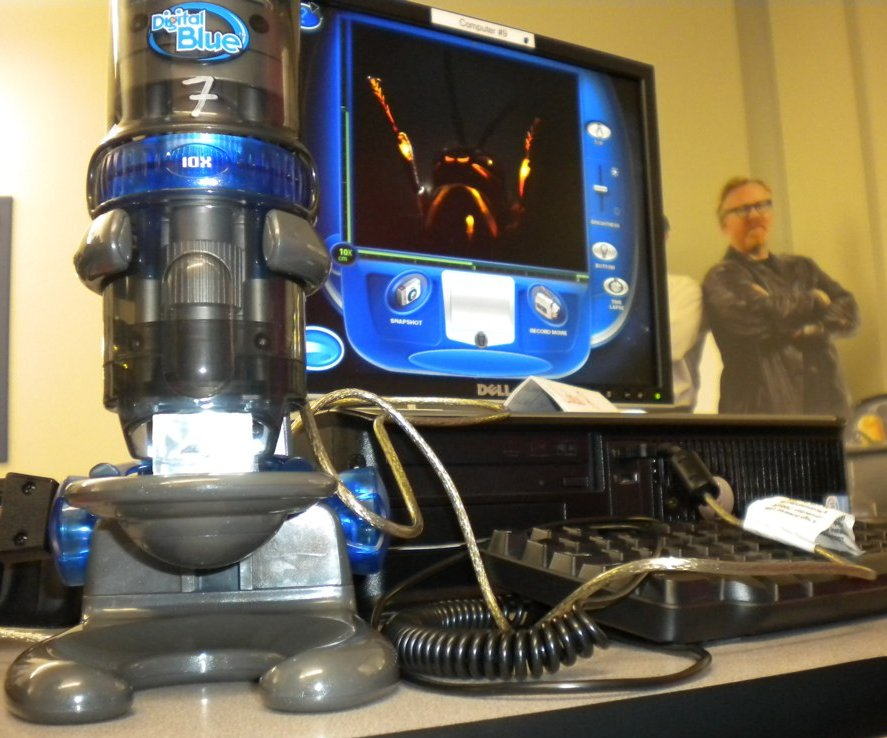
An insect observed with a digital microscope.

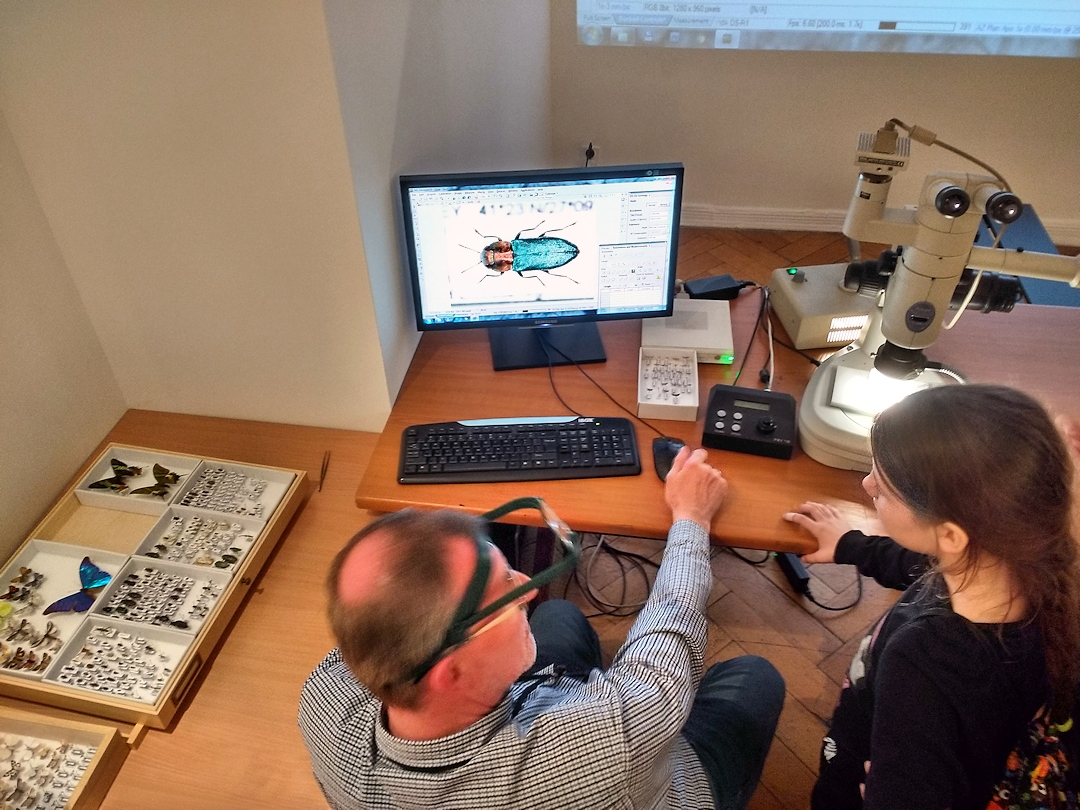
Entomologist using a digital microscope to magnify a miniature insect.

A digital microscope is a variation of a traditional optical microscope that uses optics and a digital camera to output an image to a monitor, sometimes by means of software running on a computer. A digital microscope often has its own in-built LED light source, and differs from an optical microscope in that there is no provision to observe the sample directly through an eyepiece. Since the image is focused on the digital circuit, the entire system is designed for the monitor image. The optics for the human eye are omitted.

Digital microscopes range from, usually inexpensive, USB digital microscopes to advanced industrial digital microscopes costing tens of thousands of dollars. The low price commercial microscopes normally omit the optics for illumination (for example Köhler illumination and phase contrast illumination) and are more akin to webcams with a macro lens. An optical microscope can also be fitted with a digital camera.

== History ==
An early digital microscope was made by a company in Tokyo, Japan in 1986, which is now known as Hirox Co. LTD. It included a control box and a lens connected to a computer. The original connection to the computer was analog through an S-video connection. Over time that connection was changed to FireWire 800 to handle a large amount of digital information coming from the digital camera. Around 2005 they introduced advanced all-in-one units that did not require a computer, but had the monitor and computer built-in. Then in late 2015 they released a system that once again had the computer separate, but connected to the computer by USB 3.0, taking advantage of the speed and longevity of the USB connection. This system also was much more compacted than previous models with a reduction in the number of cables and physical size of the unit itself.

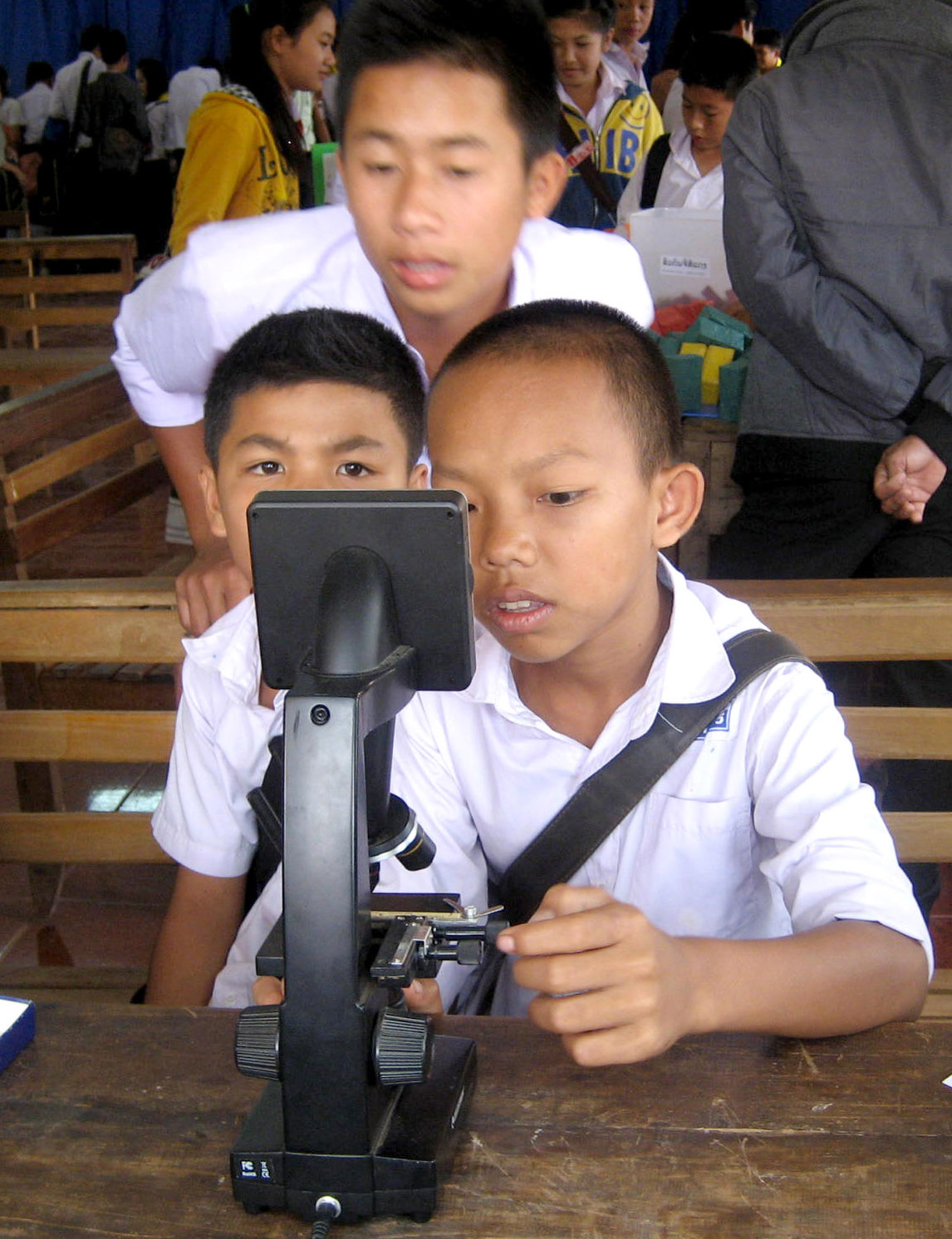
A digital microscope allows several students in Laos to examine insect parts. This model cost about US$150.

The invention of the USB port resulted in a multitude of USB microscopes ranging in quality and magnification. They continue to fall in price, especially compared with traditional optical microscopes. They offer high-resolution images which are normally recorded directly to a computer, and which also use the computer power for their built-in LED light source. The resolution is directly related to the number of megapixels available on a specific model, from 1.3 MP, 2 MP, 5 MP and upwards.

== Stereo and digital microscopes ==
A primary difference between a stereo microscope and a digital microscope is the magnification. With a stereo microscope, the magnification is determined by multiplying the eyepiece magnification times the objective magnification. Since the digital microscope does not have an eyepiece, the magnification cannot be found using this method. Instead the magnification for a digital microscope was originally determined by how many times larger the sample was reproduced on a 15” monitor. While monitor sizes have changed, the physical size of the camera chip used has not. As a result, magnification numbers and field of view are still the same as that original definition, regardless of the size of the monitor used. The average difference in magnification between an optical microscope and a digital microscope is about 40%. Thus the magnification number of a stereomicroscope is usually 40% less than the magnification number of a digital microscope.

Since the digital microscope has the image projected directly on to the CCD camera, it is possible to have higher quality recorded images than with a stereo microscope. With the stereo microscope, the lenses are made for the optics of the eye. Attaching a CCD camera to a stereo microscope will result in an image that has compromises made for the eyepiece. Although the monitor image and recorded image may be of higher quality with the digital microscope, the application of the microscope may dictate which microscope is preferred.

== Digital eyepiece for microscopes ==
Digital eyepiece for microscopes software contain wide ranges of optional accessories provides multipurpose such as phase contrast observation, Bright and dark field observation, microphotography, image processing, particle size determination in μm, pathological report and patient manager, microphotograph, recording mobility video, drawing and labeling etc.

== Resolution ==
With a typical 2 megapixel CCD, a 1600×1200 pixels image is generated. The resolution of the image depends on the field of view of the lens used with the camera. The approximate pixel resolution can be determined by dividing the horizontal field of view (FOV) by 1600.

Increased resolution can be accomplished by creating a sub-pixel image. The Pixel Shift Method uses an actuator to physically move the CCD in order to take multiple overlapping images. By combining the images within the microscope, sub-pixel resolution can be generated. This method provides sub-pixel information, averaging a standard image is also a proven method to provide sub-pixel information.

== 2D measurement ==
Most of the high-end digital microscope systems have the ability to measure samples in 2D. The measurements are done onscreen by measuring the distance from pixel to pixel. This allows for length, width, diagonal, and circle measurements as well as much more. Some systems are even capable of counting particles.

== 3D measurement ==
3D measurement is achieved with a digital microscope by image stacking. Using a step motor, the system takes images from the lowest focal plane in the field of view to the highest focal plane. Then it reconstructs these images into a 3D model based on contrast to give a 3D color image of the sample. From these 3D model measurements can be made, but their accuracy is based on the step motor and depth of field of the lens.

== 2D and 3D tiling ==
2D and 3D tiling, also known as stitching or creating a panoramic, can now be done with the more advanced digital microscope systems. In 2D tiling the image is automatically tiled together seamlessly in real-time by moving the XY stage. 3D tiling combines the XY stage movement of 2D tiling with the Z-axis movement of 3D measurement to create a 3D panoramic.

== USB microscopes ==
Salt crystals seen with a USB microscope

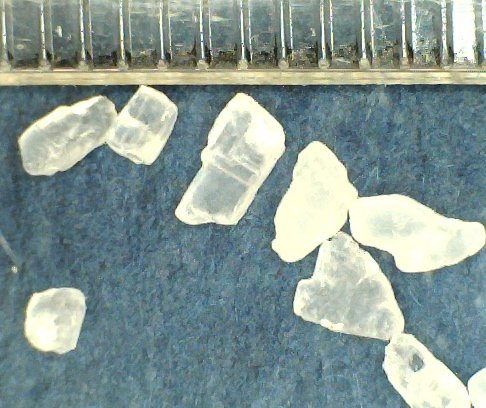
Sea salt crystals

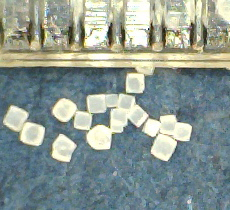
Table salt crystals
with cubic habit

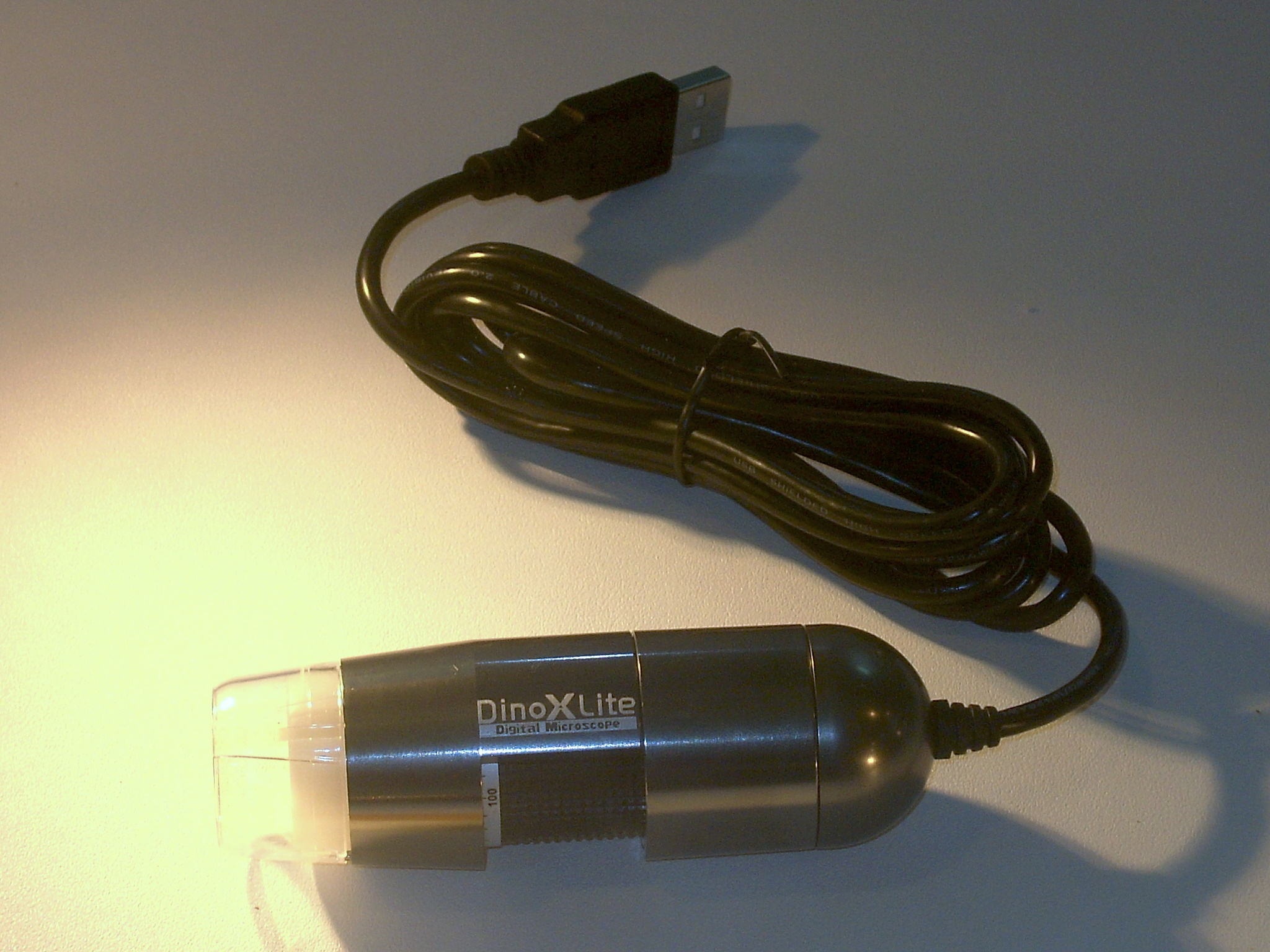
Miniature USB microscope

Digital microscopes range from inexpensive units costing from perhaps US$20, which connect to a computer via USB connector, to units costing tens of thousands of dollars. These advanced digital microscope systems usually are self-contained and do not require a computer.

Some of the cheaper microscopes which connect via USB have no stand, or a simple stand with clampable joints. They are essentially very simple webcams with small lenses and sensors—and can be used to view subjects which are not very close to the lens— mechanically arranged to allow focus at very close distances. Magnification is typically claimed to be user-adjustable from 10× to 200-400×.

Devices which connect to a computer require software to operate. The basic operation includes viewing the microscope image and recording "snapshots". More advanced functionality, possible even with simpler devices, includes recording moving images, time-lapse photography, measurement, image enhancement, annotation, etc. Many of the simpler units which connect to a computer use standard operating system facilities, and do not require device-specific drivers. A consequence of this is that many different microscope software packages can be used interchangeably with different microscopes, although such software may not support features unique to the more advanced devices. Basic operation may be possible with software included as part of computer operating systems—in Windows XP, images from microscopes which do not require special drivers can be viewed and recorded from "Scanners and Cameras" in Control Panel.

The more advanced digital microscope units have stands that hold the microscope and allow it to be racked up and down, similarly to standard optical microscopes. Calibrated movement in all three dimensions are available through the use of a step motor and automated stage. The resolution, image quality, and dynamic range vary with price. Systems with a lower number of pixels have a higher frame rate (30fps to 100fps) and faster processing. The faster processing can be seen when using functions like HDR (high dynamic range). In addition to general-purpose microscopes, instruments specialized for specific applications are produced. These units can have a magnification range up to 0–10,000x, are either all-in-one systems (computer built-in) or connect to a desktop computer. They also differ from the cheaper USB microscopes in not only the quality of the image, but also in capability, and the quality of the system's construction giving these types of systems a longer lifetime.

== See also ==
- USB microscope
- Digital image
- Microscope
- High dynamic range
- Optical microscope
- Hirox
- Digital pathology
