= Optical microscope =

Microscope that uses visible light

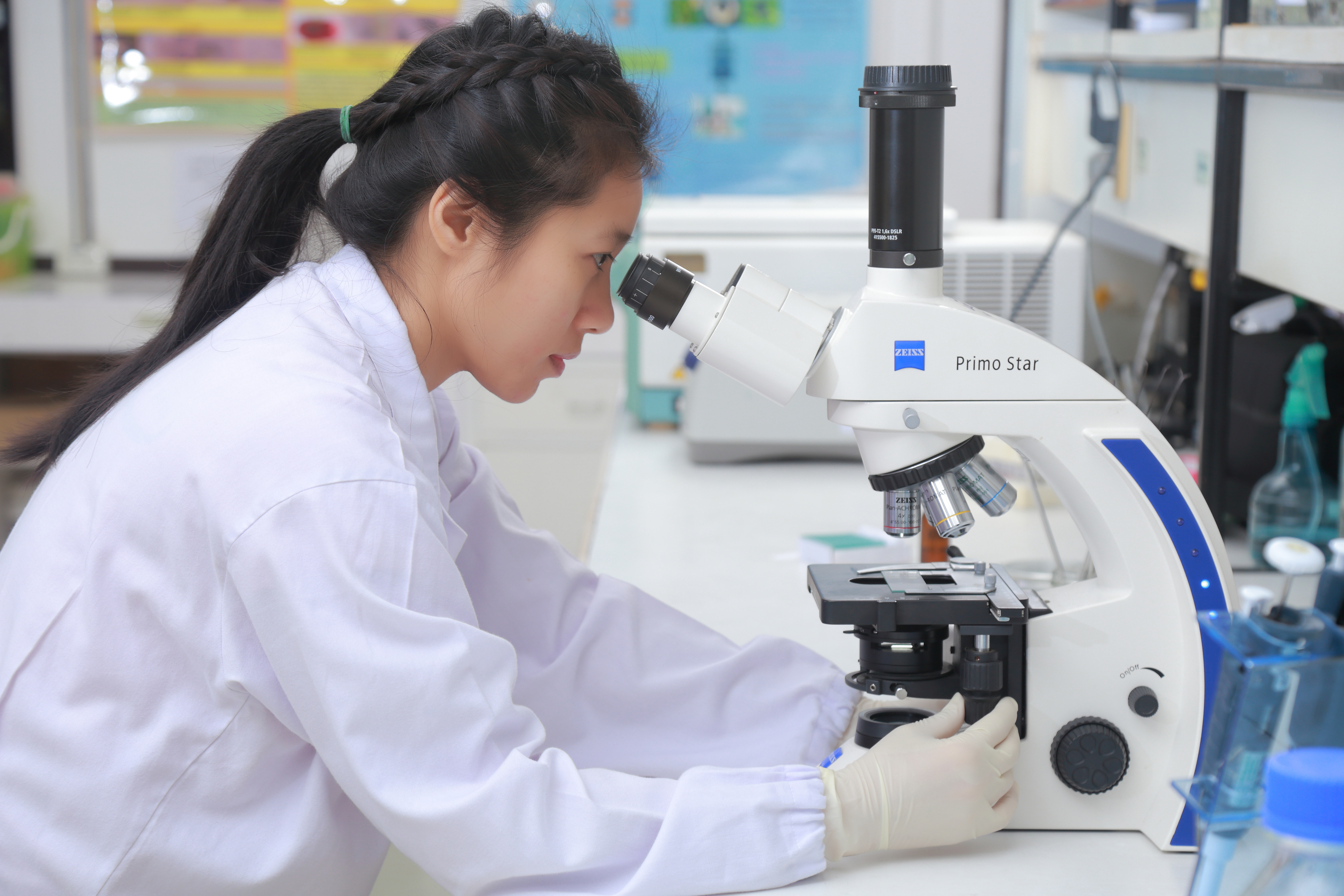
Scientist using an optical microscope in a laboratory

The optical microscope, also referred to as a light microscope, is a type of microscope that commonly uses visible light and a system of lenses to generate magnified images of small objects. Optical microscopes are the oldest type of microscope, with the present compound form first appearing in the 17th century. Basic optical microscopes can be very simple, although many complex designs aim to improve resolution and sample contrast.

Objects are placed on a stage and may be directly viewed through one or two eyepieces on the microscope. A range of objective lenses with different magnifications are usually mounted on a rotating turret between the stage and eyepiece(s), allowing magnification to be adjusted as needed. In high-power microscopes, both eyepieces typically show the same image, but with a stereo microscope, slightly different images are used to create a 3-D effect. A camera may be used to capture the magnified image (micrograph).

Objects can be lit in a variety of ways. Transparent objects can be lit from below and solid objects can be lit with light coming through (bright field) or around (dark field) the objective lens. Polarised light may be used to determine crystal orientation of metallic objects. Phase-contrast imaging can be used to increase image contrast by highlighting small details of differing refractive index.

The maximum resolving power of optical microscopes is typically limited to around 200 nanometers because of the diffraction limit of visible light. While larger magnifications are possible no additional details of the object are resolved. Alternatives to optical microscopy which do not use visible light include scanning electron microscopy, transmission electron microscopy and scanning probe microscopy, which can achieve much greater magnifications than optical microscopy.

== Types ==
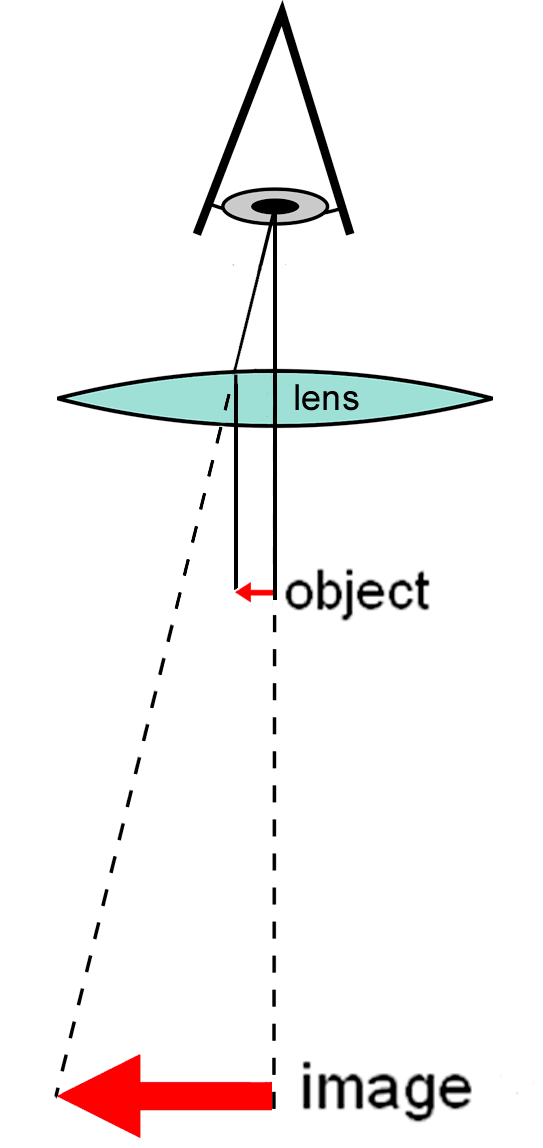
Diagram of a simple microscope

There are two basic types of optical microscopes: simple microscopes and compound microscopes. A simple microscope uses the optical power of a single lens or group of lenses for magnification. A compound microscope uses a system of lenses (one set enlarging the image produced by another) to achieve a much higher magnification of an object. The vast majority of modern research microscopes are compound microscopes, while some cheaper commercial digital microscopes are simple single-lens microscopes. Compound microscopes can be further divided into a variety of other types of microscopes, which differ in their optical configurations, cost, and intended purposes.

=== Simple microscope ===
A simple microscope uses a lens or set of lenses to enlarge an object through angular magnification alone, giving the viewer an erect enlarged virtual image. The use of a single convex lens or groups of lenses are found in simple magnification devices such as the magnifying glass, loupes, and eyepieces for telescopes and microscopes.

=== Compound microscope ===
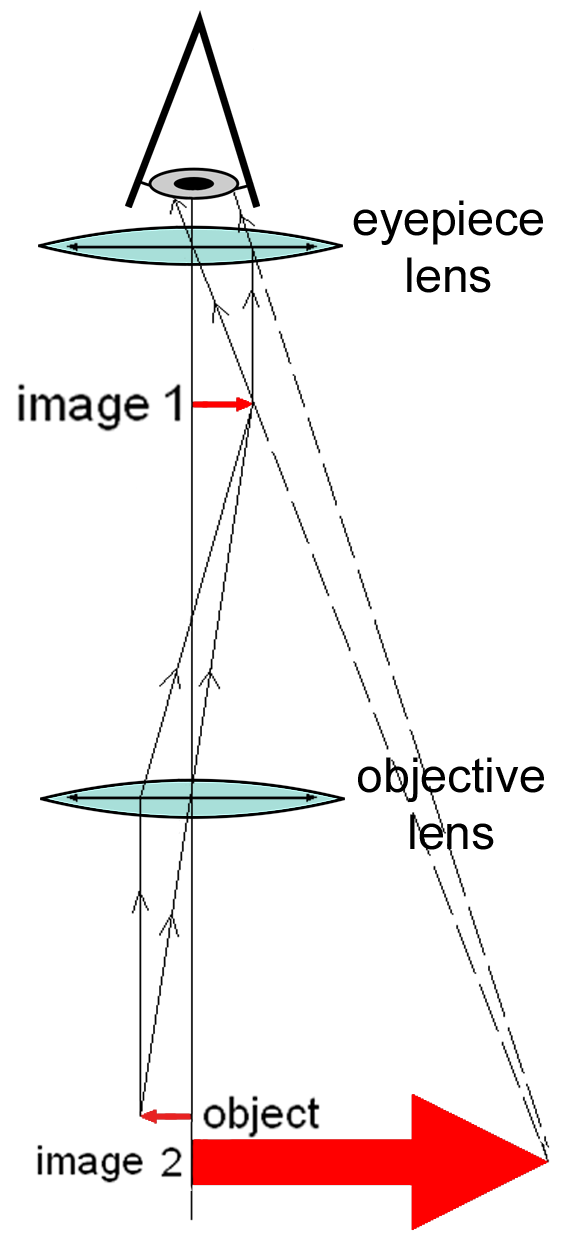
Diagram of a compound microscope

A compound microscope uses a lens close to the object being viewed to collect light (called the objective lens), which focuses a real image of the object inside the microscope. That image is then magnified by a second lens or group of lenses (called the eyepiece) that gives the viewer an enlarged inverted virtual image of the object.

The use of a compound objective-eyepiece combination allows for much higher angular magnification: For an object of height $h$, it can at most occupy an unmagnified angular size $\theta_0 = h / d_0$ while remaining in focus, achieved when it is placed at the near point distance $d_0$ of the eye (about 11 cm). The virtual image created by the compound microscope achieves an angular size of $\theta = -h s /f_\text{objective}f_\text{eyepiece}$, where $s$ is the distance between the neighboring objective and eyepiece focal points. This is an angular magnification of $\theta/\theta_0 = -s d_0 /f_\text{objective}f_\text{eyepiece}$.

Common compound microscopes often feature exchangeable objective lenses, allowing the user to quickly adjust the magnification. A compound microscope also enables more advanced illumination setups, such as phase contrast.

=== Other microscope variants ===
There are many variants of the compound optical microscope design for specialized purposes. Some of these are physical design differences allowing specialization for certain purposes:

- Stereo microscope, a low-powered microscope which provides a stereoscopic view of the sample, commonly used for dissection.
- Comparison microscope has two separate light paths allowing direct comparison of two samples via one image in each eye.
- Inverted microscope, for studying samples from below; useful for cell cultures in liquid or for metallography.
- Fiber optic connector inspection microscope, designed for connector end-face inspection
- Traveling microscope, for studying samples of high optical resolution.

Other microscope variants are designed for different illumination techniques:

- Petrographic microscope, whose design usually includes a polarizing filter, rotating stage, and gypsum plate to facilitate the study of minerals or other crystalline materials whose optical properties can vary with orientation.
- Polarizing microscope, similar to the petrographic microscope.
- Phase-contrast microscope, which applies the phase contrast illumination method.
- Epifluorescence microscope, designed for analysis of samples that include fluorophores.
- Confocal microscope, a widely used variant of epifluorescent illumination that uses a scanning laser to illuminate a sample for fluorescence.
- Two-photon microscope, used to image fluorescence deeper in scattering media and reduce photobleaching, especially in living samples.
- Student microscope – an often low-power microscope with simplified controls and sometimes low-quality optics designed for school use or as a starter instrument for children.
- Ultramicroscope, an adapted light microscope that uses light scattering to allow viewing of tiny particles whose diameter is below or near the wavelength of visible light (around 500 nanometers); mostly obsolete since the advent of electron microscopes
- Tip-enhanced Raman microscope, is a variant of optical microscope based on tip-enhanced Raman spectroscopy, without traditional wavelength-based resolution limits. This microscope primarily realized on the scanning-probe microscope platforms using all optical tools.

=== Digital microscope ===
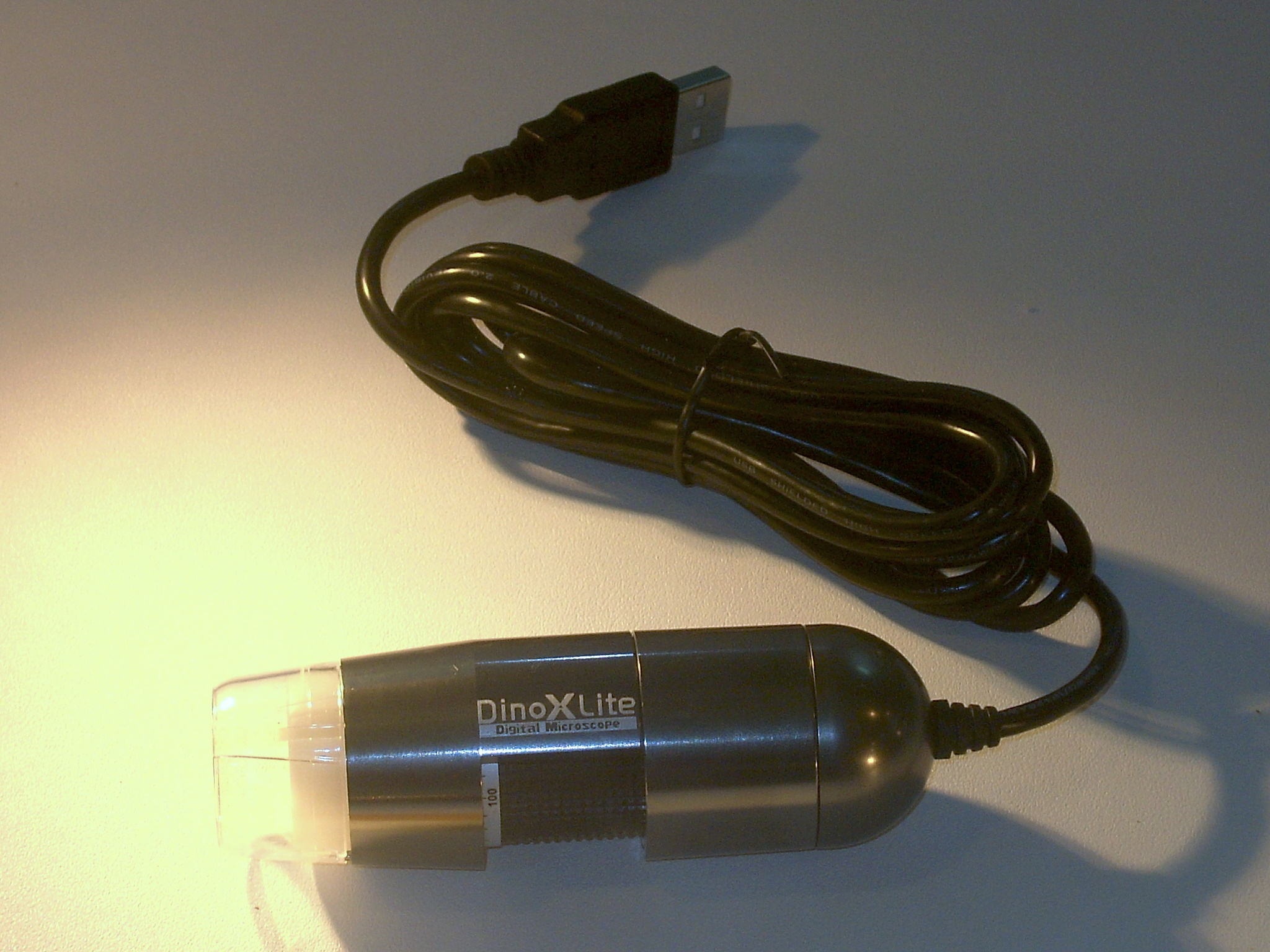
A miniature USB microscope

A digital microscope is a microscope equipped with a digital camera allowing observation of a sample via a computer. Microscopes can also be partly or wholly computer-controlled with various levels of automation. Digital microscopy allows greater analysis of a microscope image, for example, measurements of distances and areas and quantitation of a fluorescent or histological stain.

Low-powered digital microscopes, USB microscopes, are also commercially available. These are essentially webcams with a high-powered macro lens and generally do not use transillumination. The camera is attached directly to a computer's USB port to show the images directly on the monitor. High-power illumination is usually provided by an LED source or sources adjacent to the camera lens.

Digital microscopy with very low light levels to avoid damage to vulnerable biological samples is available using sensitive photon-counting digital cameras. It has been demonstrated that a light source providing pairs of entangled photons may minimize the risk of damage to the most light-sensitive samples. In this application of ghost imaging to photon-sparse microscopy, the sample is illuminated with infrared photons, each spatially correlated with an entangled partner in the visible band for efficient imaging by a photon-counting camera.

== History ==
=== Invention ===
The earliest microscopes were single lens magnifying glasses with limited magnification, which date at least as far back as the widespread use of lenses in eyeglasses in the 13th century.

Compound microscopes first appeared in Europe around 1620 including one demonstrated by Cornelis Drebbel in London (around 1621) and one exhibited in Rome in 1624.

The actual inventor of the compound microscope is unknown although many claims have been made over the years. These include a claim 35 years after they appeared by Dutch spectacle-maker Johannes Zachariassen that his father, Zacharias Janssen, invented the compound microscope and/or the telescope as early as 1590. Johannes' testimony, which some claim is dubious, pushes the invention date so far back that Zacharias would have been a child at the time, leading to speculation that, for Johannes' claim to be true, the compound microscope would have to have been invented by Johannes' grandfather, Hans Martens. Another claim is that Janssen's competitor, Hans Lippershey (who applied for the first telescope patent in 1608) also invented the compound microscope. Other historians point to the Dutch innovator Cornelis Drebbel with his 1621 compound microscope.

Galileo Galilei is sometimes cited as a compound microscope inventor. After 1610, he found that he could close focus his telescope to view small objects, such as flies, close up and/or could look through the wrong end in reverse to magnify small objects. The only drawback was that his 2 foot long telescope had to be extended out to 6 feet to view objects that close. After seeing the compound microscope built by Drebbel exhibited in Rome in 1624, Galileo built his own improved version. In 1625, Giovanni Faber coined the name microscope for the compound microscope Galileo submitted to the Accademia dei Lincei in 1624 (Galileo had called it the "occhiolino" or "little eye"). Faber coined the name from the Greek words μικρόν (micron) meaning "small", and σκοπεῖν (skopein) meaning "to look at", a name meant to be analogous with "telescope", another word coined by the Linceans.

Christiaan Huygens, another Dutchman, developed a simple 2-lens ocular system in the late 17th century that was achromatically corrected, and therefore a huge step forward in microscope development. The Huygens ocular is still being produced to this day, but suffers from a small field size, and other minor disadvantages.

=== Popularization ===
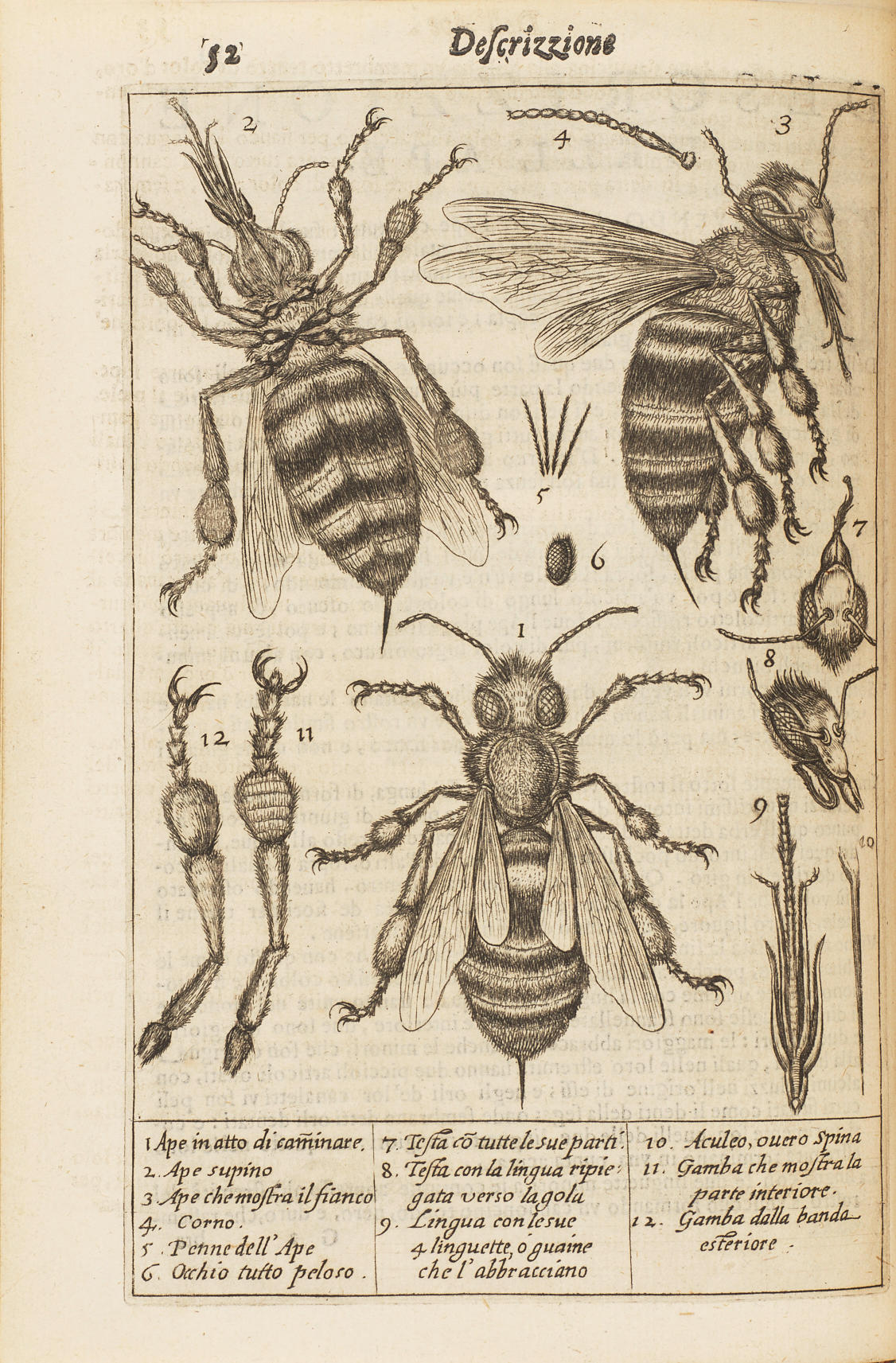
The oldest published image known to have been made with a microscope: bees by Francesco Stelluti, 1630

Antonie van Leeuwenhoek (1632–1724) is credited with bringing the microscope to the attention of biologists, even though simple magnifying lenses were already being produced in the 16th century. Van Leeuwenhoek's home-made microscopes were simple microscopes, with a single very small, yet strong lens. They were awkward in use, but enabled van Leeuwenhoek to see detailed images. It took about 150 years of optical development before the compound microscope was able to provide the same quality image as van Leeuwenhoek's simple microscopes, due to difficulties in configuring multiple lenses. In the 1850s, John Leonard Riddell, Professor of Chemistry at Tulane University, invented the first practical binocular microscope while carrying out one of the earliest and most extensive American microscopic investigations of cholera.

=== Lighting techniques ===
While basic microscope technology and optics have been available for over 400 years it is much more recently that techniques in sample illumination were developed to generate the high quality images seen today.

In August 1893, August Köhler developed Köhler illumination. This method of sample illumination gives rise to extremely even lighting and overcomes many limitations of older techniques of sample illumination. Before development of Köhler illumination the image of the light source, for example a lightbulb filament, was always visible in the image of the sample.

The Nobel Prize in physics was awarded to Dutch physicist Frits Zernike in 1953 for his development of phase contrast illumination which allows imaging of transparent samples. By using interference rather than absorption of light, extremely transparent samples, such as live mammalian cells, can be imaged without having to use staining techniques. Just two years later, in 1955, Georges Nomarski published the theory for differential interference contrast microscopy, another interference-based imaging technique.

=== Fluorescence microscopy ===
Modern biological microscopy depends heavily on the development of fluorescent probes for specific structures within a cell. In contrast to normal transilluminated light microscopy, in fluorescence microscopy the sample is illuminated through the objective lens with a narrow set of wavelengths of light. This light interacts with fluorophores in the sample which then emit light of a longer wavelength. It is this emitted light which makes up the image.

Since the mid-20th century chemical fluorescent stains, such as DAPI which binds to DNA, have been used to label specific structures within the cell. More recent developments include immunofluorescence, which uses fluorescently labelled antibodies to recognise specific proteins within a sample, and fluorescent proteins like GFP which a live cell can express making it fluorescent.

== Components ==
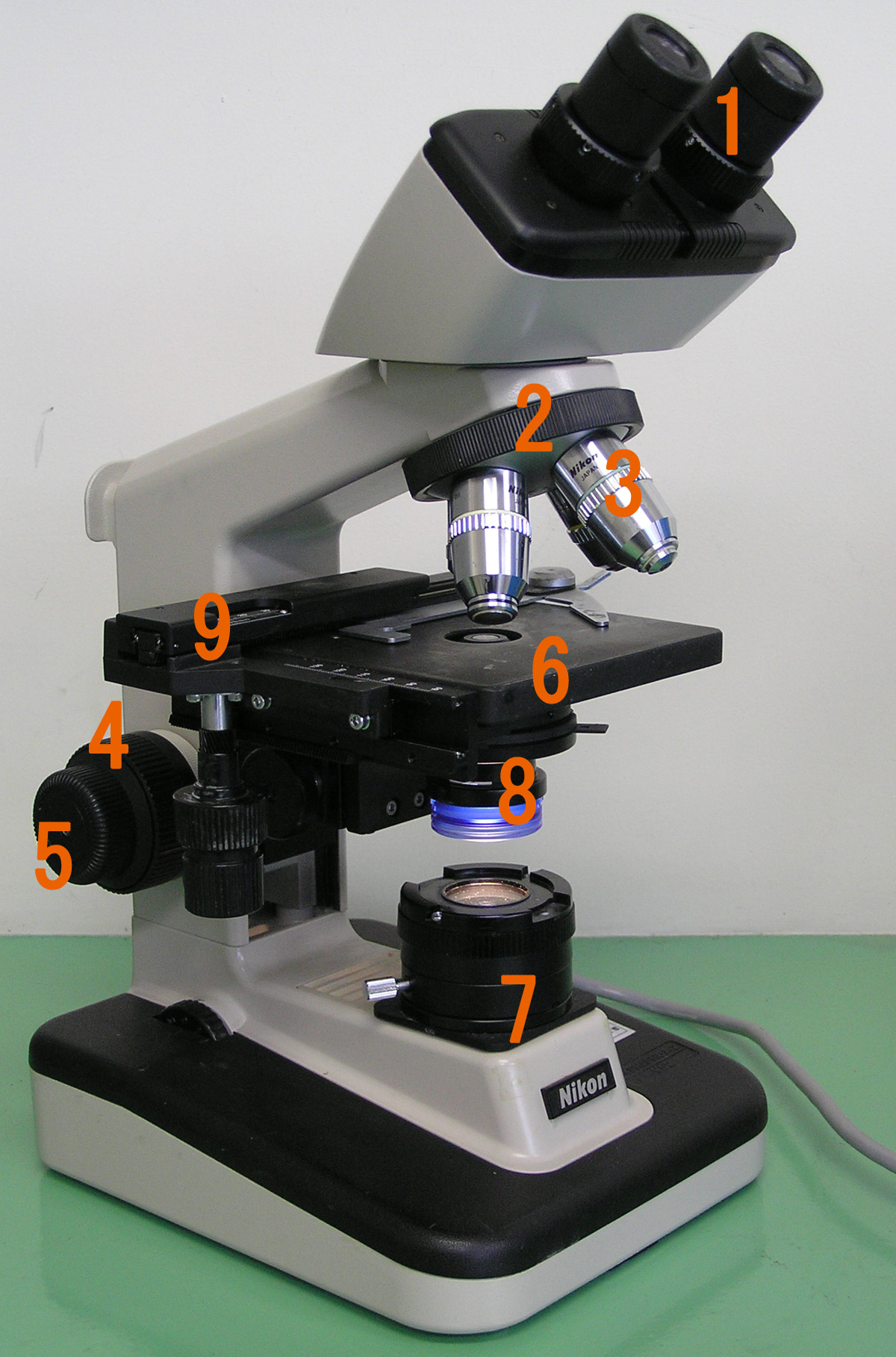
Basic optical transmission microscope elements (1990s)

All modern optical microscopes designed for viewing samples by transmitted light share the same basic components of the light path. In addition, the vast majority of microscopes have the same 'structural' components (numbered below according to the image on the right):

- Eyepiece (ocular lens) (1)
- Objective turret, revolver, or revolving nose piece (to hold multiple objective lenses) (2)
- Objective lenses (3)
- Focus knobs (to move the stage)
  - Coarse adjustment (4)
  - Fine adjustment (5)
- Stage (to hold the specimen) (6)
- Light source (a light or a mirror) (7)
- Diaphragm and condenser (8)
- Mechanical stage (9)

=== Eyepiece (ocular lens) ===
The eyepiece, or ocular lens, is a cylinder containing two or more lenses; its function is to bring the image into focus for the eye. The eyepiece is inserted into the top end of the body tube. Eyepieces are interchangeable and many different eyepieces can be inserted with different degrees of magnification. Typical magnification values for eyepieces include 5×, 10× (the most common), 15× and 20×. In some high performance microscopes, the optical configuration of the objective lens and eyepiece are matched to give the best possible optical performance. This occurs most commonly with apochromatic objectives.

=== Objective turret (revolver or revolving nose piece) ===
Objective turret, revolver, or revolving nose piece is the part that holds the set of objective lenses. It allows the user to switch between objective lenses.

=== Objective lens ===
At the lower end of a typical compound optical microscope, there are one or more objective lenses that collect light from the sample. The objective is usually in a cylinder housing containing a glass single or multi-element compound lens. Typically there will be around three objective lenses screwed into a circular nose piece which may be rotated to select the required objective lens. These arrangements are designed to be parfocal, which means that when one changes from one lens to another on a microscope, the sample stays in focus. Microscope objectives are characterized by two parameters, namely, magnification and numerical aperture. The former typically ranges from 5× to 100× while the latter ranges from 0.14 to 0.7, corresponding to focal lengths of about 40 to 2 mm, respectively. Objective lenses with higher magnifications normally have a higher numerical aperture and a shorter depth of field in the resulting image. Some high performance objective lenses may require matched eyepieces to deliver the best optical performance.

==== Oil immersion objective ====
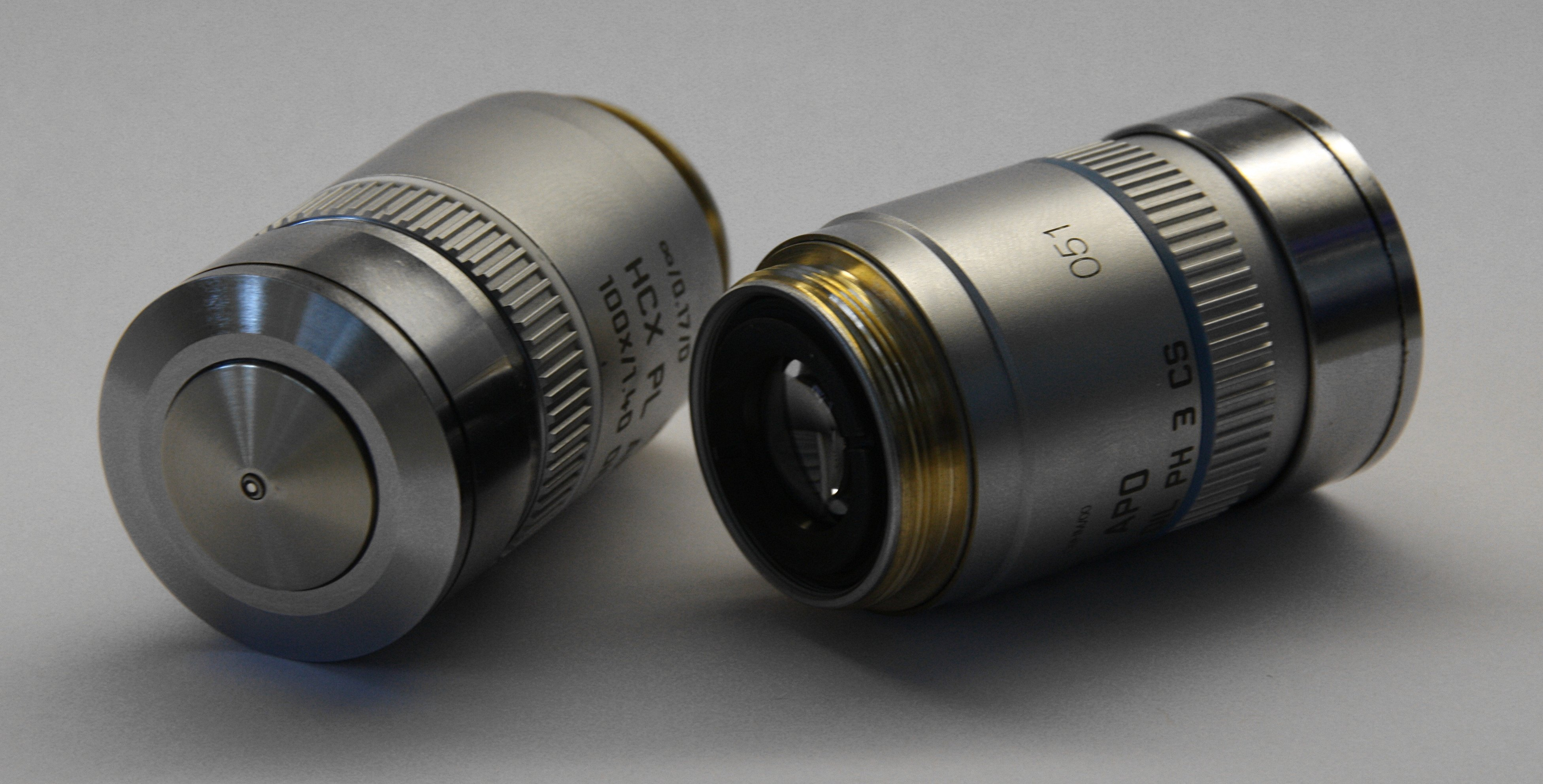
Two Leica oil immersion microscope objective lenses: 100× (left) and 40×

Some microscopes make use of oil-immersion objectives or water-immersion objectives for greater resolution at high magnification. These are used with index-matching material such as immersion oil or water and a matched cover slip between the objective lens and the sample. The refractive index of the index-matching material is higher than air allowing the objective lens to have a larger numerical aperture (greater than 1) so that the light is transmitted from the specimen to the outer face of the objective lens with minimal refraction. Numerical apertures as high as 1.6 can be achieved. The larger numerical aperture allows collection of more light making detailed observation of smaller details possible. An oil immersion lens usually has a magnification of 40 to 100×.

=== Focus knobs ===
Adjustment knobs move the stage up and down with separate adjustment for coarse and fine focusing. The same controls enable the microscope to adjust to specimens of different thickness. In older designs of microscopes, the focus adjustment wheels move the microscope tube up or down relative to the stand and had a fixed stage.

=== Frame ===
The whole of the optical assembly is traditionally attached to a rigid arm, which in turn is attached to a robust U-shaped foot to provide the necessary rigidity. The arm angle may be adjustable to allow the viewing angle to be adjusted.

The frame provides a mounting point for various microscope controls. Normally this will include controls for focusing, typically a large knurled wheel to adjust coarse focus, together with a smaller knurled wheel to control fine focus. Other features may be lamp controls and/or controls for adjusting the condenser.

=== Stage ===
The stage is a platform below the objective lens which supports the specimen being viewed. In the center of the stage is a hole through which light passes to illuminate the specimen. The stage usually has arms to hold slides (rectangular glass plates with typical dimensions of 25×75 mm, on which the specimen is mounted).

At magnifications higher than 100× moving a slide by hand is not practical. A mechanical stage, typical of medium and higher priced microscopes, allows tiny movements of the slide via control knobs that reposition the sample/slide as desired. If a microscope did not originally have a mechanical stage it may be possible to add one.

All stages move up and down for focus. With a mechanical stage slides move on two horizontal axes for positioning the specimen to examine specimen details.

Focusing starts at lower magnification in order to center the specimen by the user on the stage. Moving to a higher magnification requires the stage to be moved higher vertically for re-focus at the higher magnification and may also require slight horizontal specimen position adjustment. Horizontal specimen position adjustments are the reason for having a mechanical stage.

Due to the difficulty in preparing specimens and mounting them on slides, for children it is best to begin with prepared slides that are centered and focus easily regardless of the focus level used.

=== Light source ===
Many sources of light can be used. At its simplest, daylight is directed via a mirror. Most microscopes, however, have their own adjustable and controllable light source – often a halogen lamp, although illumination using LEDs and lasers are becoming a more common provision. Köhler illumination is often provided on more expensive instruments.

=== Condenser ===
The condenser is a lens designed to focus light from the illumination source onto the sample. The condenser may also include other features, such as a diaphragm and/or filters, to manage the quality and intensity of the illumination. For illumination techniques like dark field, phase contrast and differential interference contrast microscopy additional optical components must be precisely aligned in the light path.

=== Magnification ===
The actual power or magnification of a compound optical microscope is the product of the powers of the eyepiece and the objective lens. For example a 10x eyepiece magnification and a 100x objective lens magnification gives a total magnification of 1,000×. Modified environments such as the use of oil or ultraviolet light can increase the resolution and allow for resolved details at magnifications larger than 1,000x.

== Operation ==
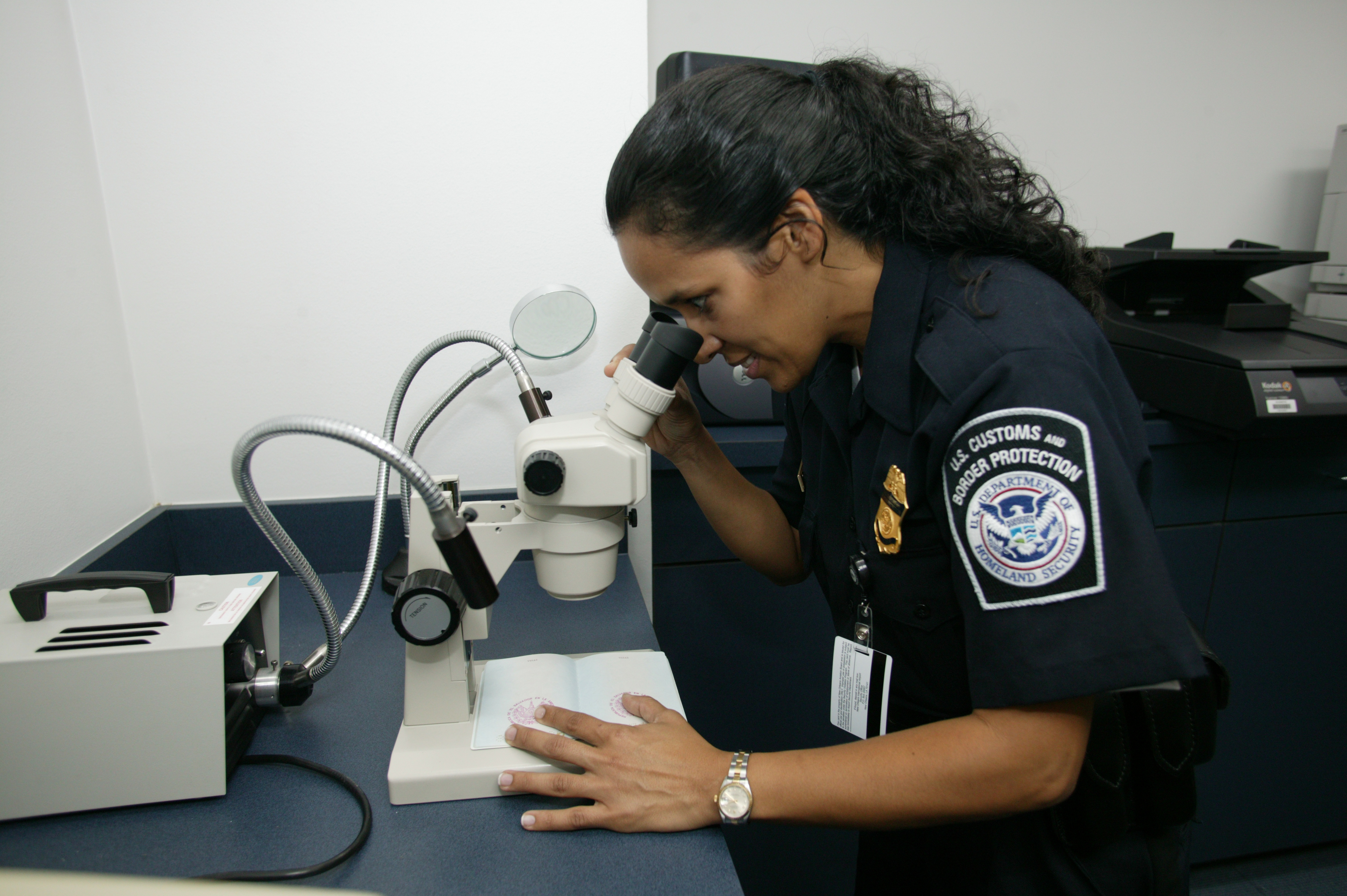
U.S. CBP Office of Field Operations agent checking the authenticity of a travel document at an international airport using a stereo microscope

=== Illumination techniques ===
Many techniques are available which modify the light path to generate an improved contrast image from a sample. Major techniques for generating increased contrast from the sample include cross-polarized light, dark field, phase contrast and differential interference contrast illumination. A recent technique (Sarfus) combines cross-polarized light and specific contrast-enhanced slides for the visualization of nanometric samples.

Four examples of transilumination techniques used to generate contrast in a sample of tissue paper. 1.559 μm/pixel.

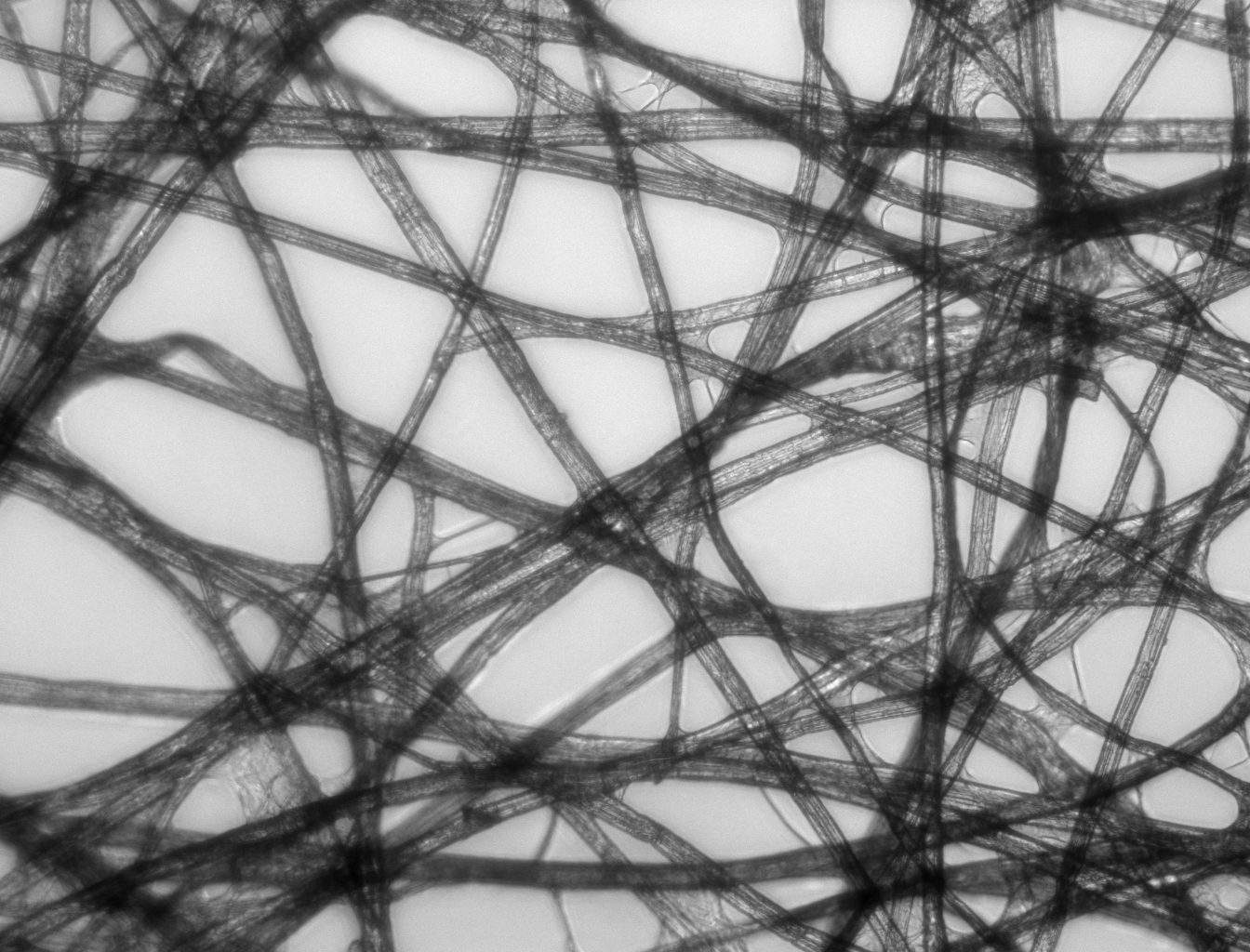
Bright field illumination, sample contrast comes from absorbance of light in the sample.

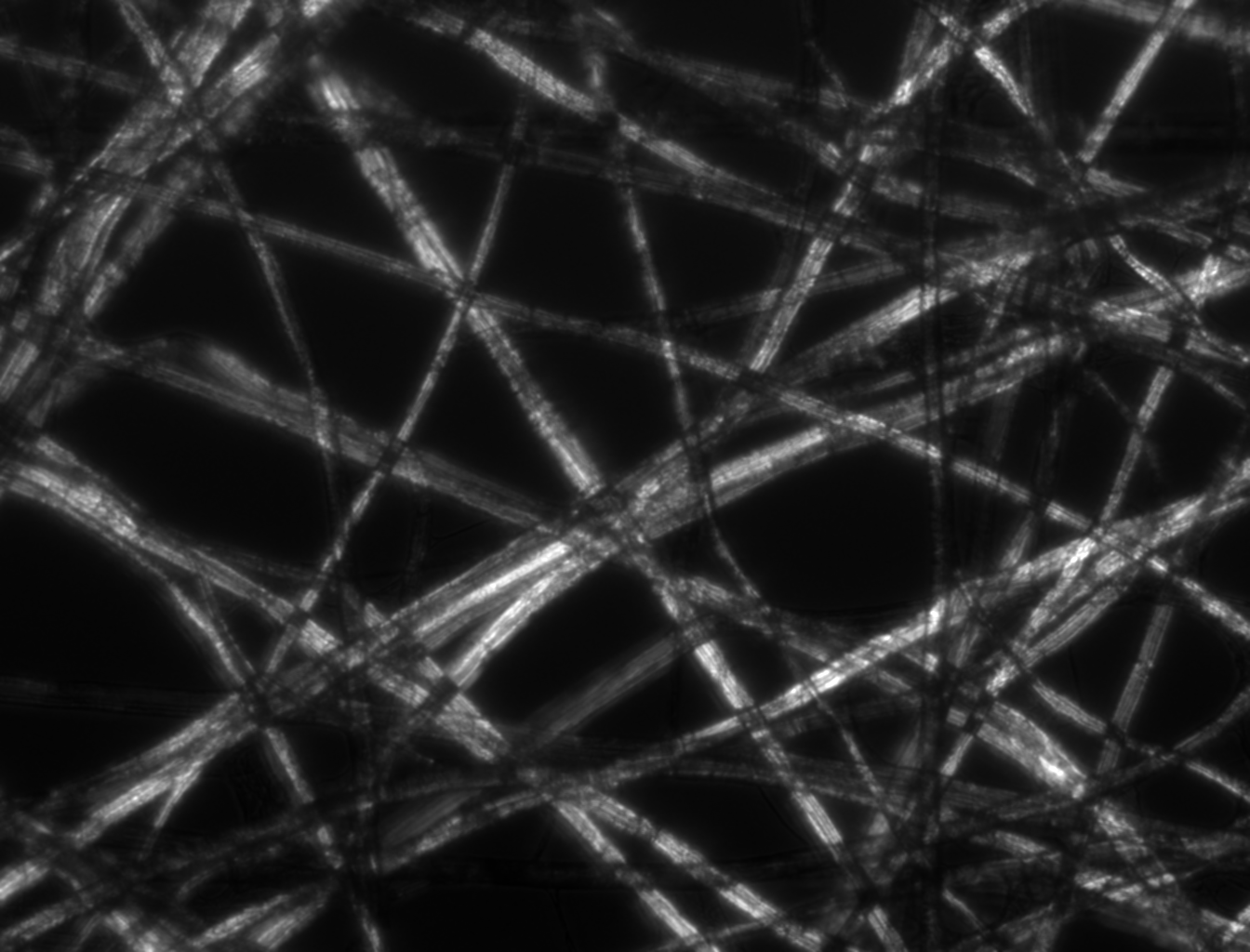
Cross-polarized light illumination, sample contrast comes from rotation of polarized light through the sample.

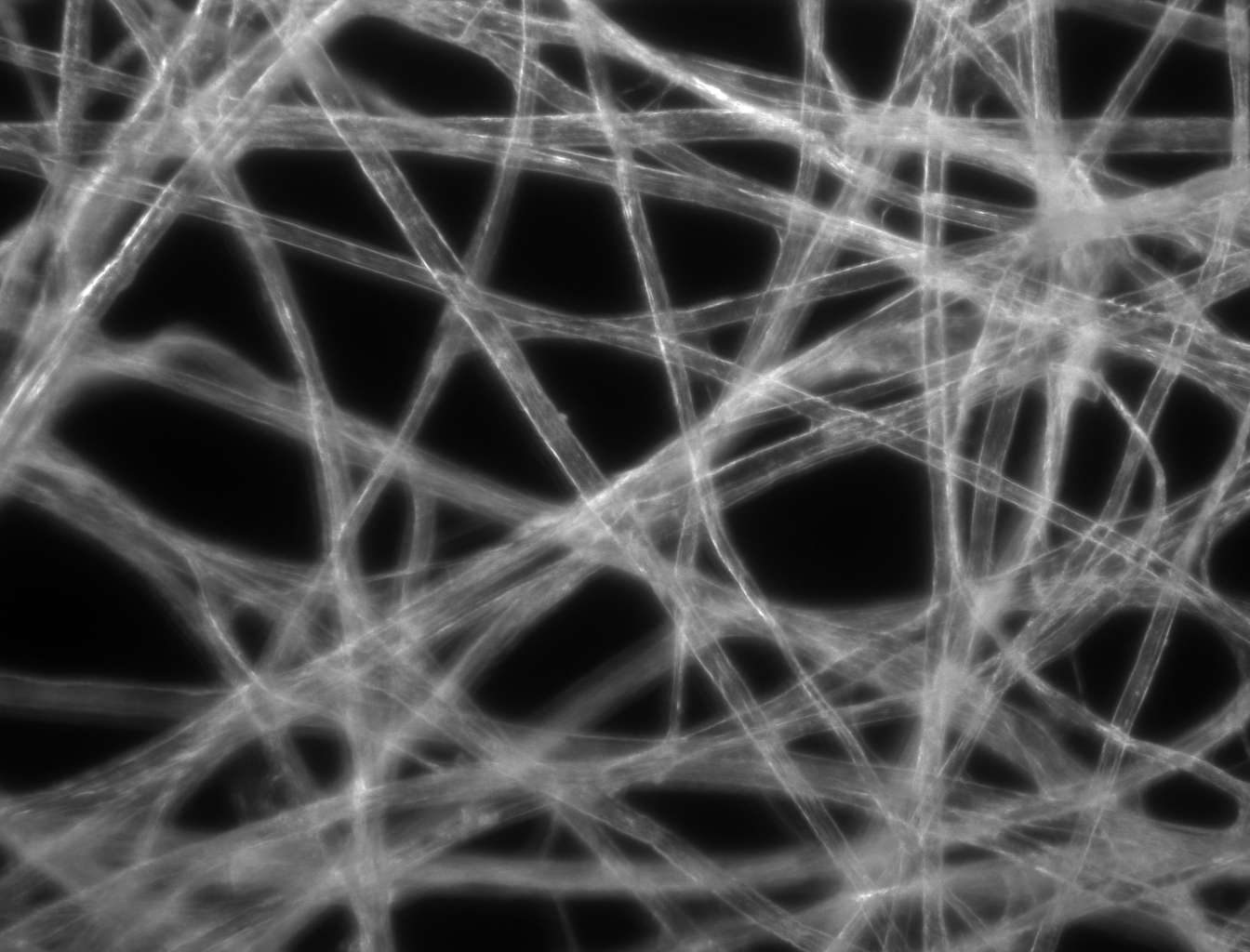
Dark field illumination, sample contrast comes from light scattered by the sample.

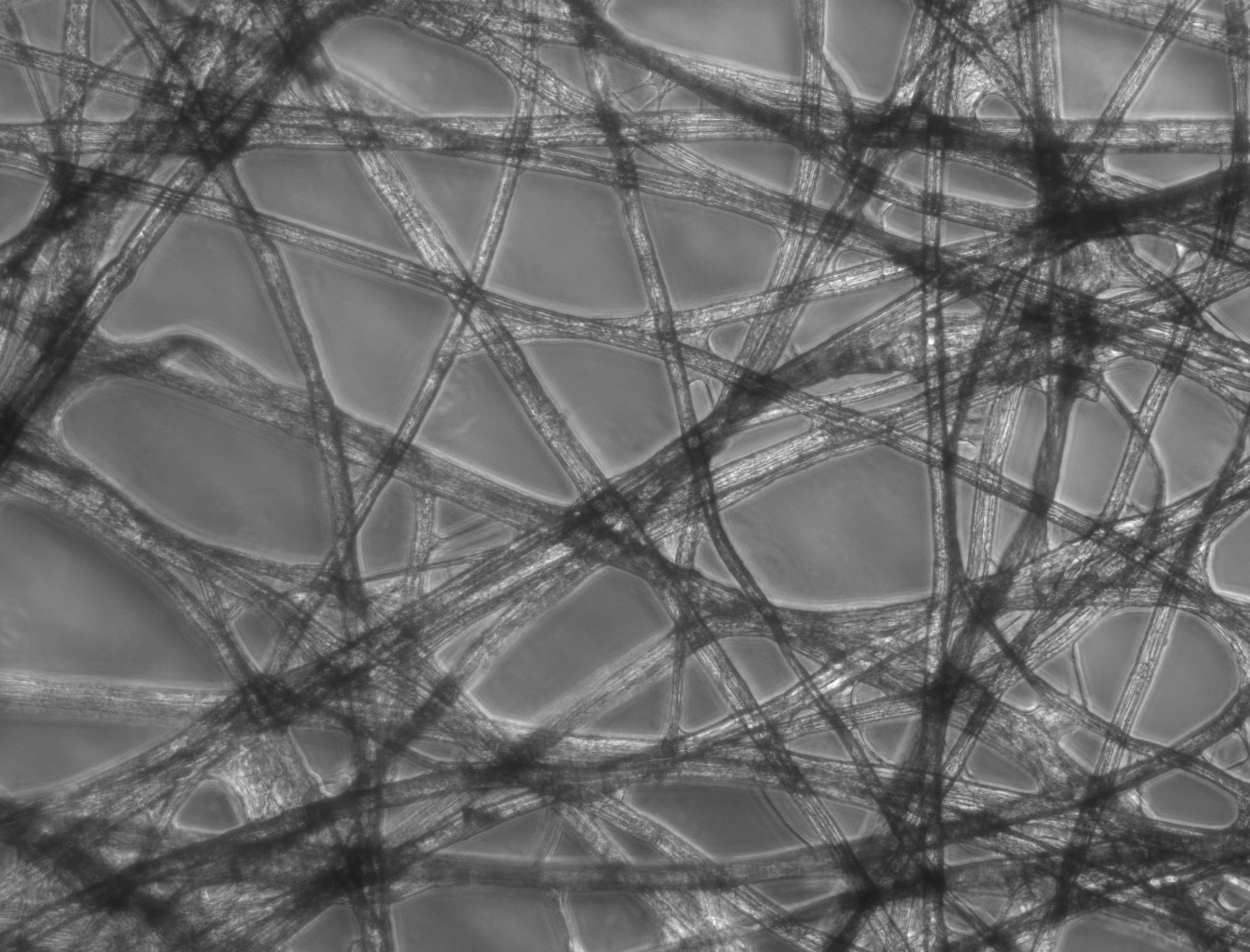
Phase contrast illumination, sample contrast comes from interference of different path lengths of light through the sample.

=== Other techniques ===
Modern microscopes allow more than just observation of transmitted light image of a sample; there are many techniques which can be used to extract other kinds of data. Most of these require additional equipment in addition to a basic compound microscope.

- Reflected light, or incident, illumination (for analysis of surface structures)
- Fluorescence microscopy, both:

- Epifluorescence microscopy
- Confocal microscopy

- Microspectroscopy (where a UV-visible spectrophotometer is integrated with an optical microscope)
- Ultraviolet microscopy
- Near-Infrared microscopy
- Multiple transmission microscopy for contrast enhancement and aberration reduction.
- Automation (for automatic scanning of a large sample or image capture)

== Applications ==
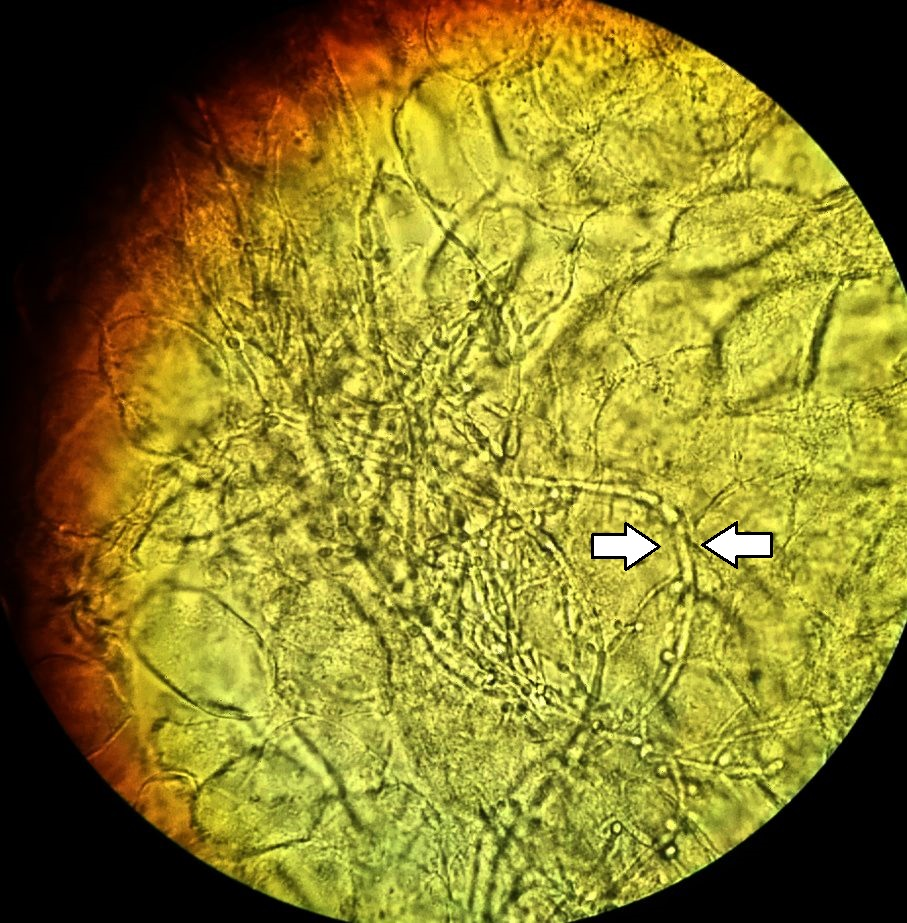
A 40x magnification image of cells in a medical smear test taken through an optical microscope using a wet mount technique, placing the specimen on a glass slide and mixing with a salt solution

Optical microscopy is used extensively in microelectronics, nanophysics, biotechnology, pharmaceutic research, mineralogy and microbiology.

Optical microscopy is used for medical diagnosis, the field being termed histopathology when dealing with tissues, or in smear tests on free cells or tissue fragments.

In industrial use, binocular microscopes are common. Aside from applications needing true depth perception, the use of dual eyepieces reduces eye strain associated with long workdays at a microscopy station. In certain applications, long-working-distance or long-focus microscopes are beneficial. An item may need to be examined behind a window, or industrial subjects may be a hazard to the objective. Such optics resemble telescopes with close-focus capabilities.

Measuring microscopes are used for precision measurement. There are two basic types. One has a reticle graduated to allow measuring distances in the focal plane. The other (and older) type has simple crosshairs and a micrometer mechanism for moving the subject relative to the microscope.

Very small, portable microscopes have found some usage in places where a laboratory microscope would be a burden.

== Limitations ==
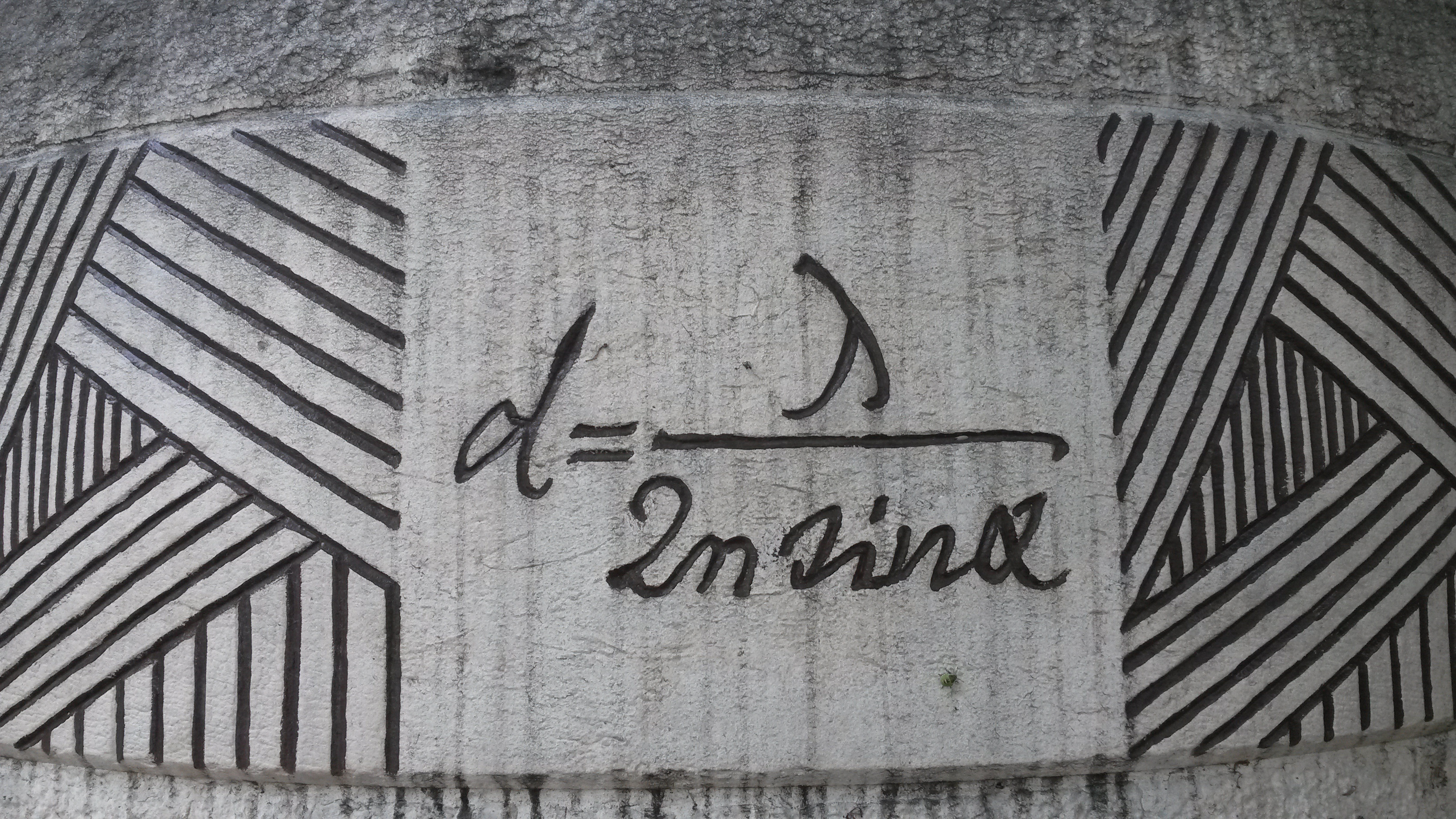
The diffraction limit set in stone on a monument for Ernst Abbe

At very high magnifications with transmitted light, point objects are seen as fuzzy discs surrounded by diffraction rings. These are called Airy disks. The resolving power of a microscope is taken as the ability to distinguish between two closely spaced Airy disks (or, in other words the ability of the microscope to reveal adjacent structural detail as distinct and separate). It is these impacts of diffraction that limit the ability to resolve fine details. The extent and magnitude of the diffraction patterns are affected by both the wavelength of light (λ), the refractive materials used to manufacture the objective lens and the numerical aperture (NA) of the objective lens. There is therefore a finite limit beyond which it is impossible to resolve separate points in the objective field, known as the diffraction limit. Assuming that optical aberrations in the whole optical set-up are negligible, the resolution d, can be stated as:

$$d = \frac { \lambda } { 2 NA }$$

Usually a wavelength of 550 nm is assumed, which corresponds to green light. With air as the external medium, the highest practical NA is 0.95, and with oil, up to 1.5. In practice, the lowest value of d obtainable with conventional lenses is about 200 nm. A new type of lens using multiple scattering of light allowed to improve the resolution to below 100 nm.

=== Surpassing the resolution limit ===
Multiple techniques are available for reaching resolutions higher than the transmitted light limit described above. Holographic techniques, as described by Courjon and Bulabois in 1979, are also capable of breaking this resolution limit, although resolution was restricted in their experimental analysis.

Using fluorescent samples, more techniques are available. Examples include Vertico SMI, near field scanning optical microscopy which uses evanescent waves, and stimulated emission depletion. In 2005, a microscope capable of detecting a single molecule was described as a teaching tool.

Despite significant progress in the last decade, techniques for surpassing the diffraction limit remain limited and specialized.

While most techniques focus on increases in lateral resolution, there are also some techniques which aim to allow analysis of extremely thin samples. For example, sarfus methods place the thin sample on a contrast-enhancing surface and thereby allows to directly visualize films as thin as 0.3 nanometers.

On 8 October 2014, the Nobel Prize in Chemistry was awarded to Eric Betzig, William Moerner and Stefan Hell for the development of super-resolved fluorescence microscopy.

==== Structured illumination SMI ====
SMI (spatially modulated illumination microscopy) is a light optical process of the so-called point spread function (PSF) engineering. These are processes which modify the PSF of a microscope in a suitable manner to either increase the optical resolution, to maximize the precision of distance measurements of fluorescent objects that are small relative to the wavelength of the illuminating light, or to extract other structural parameters in the nanometer range.

==== Localization microscopy SPDMphymod ====
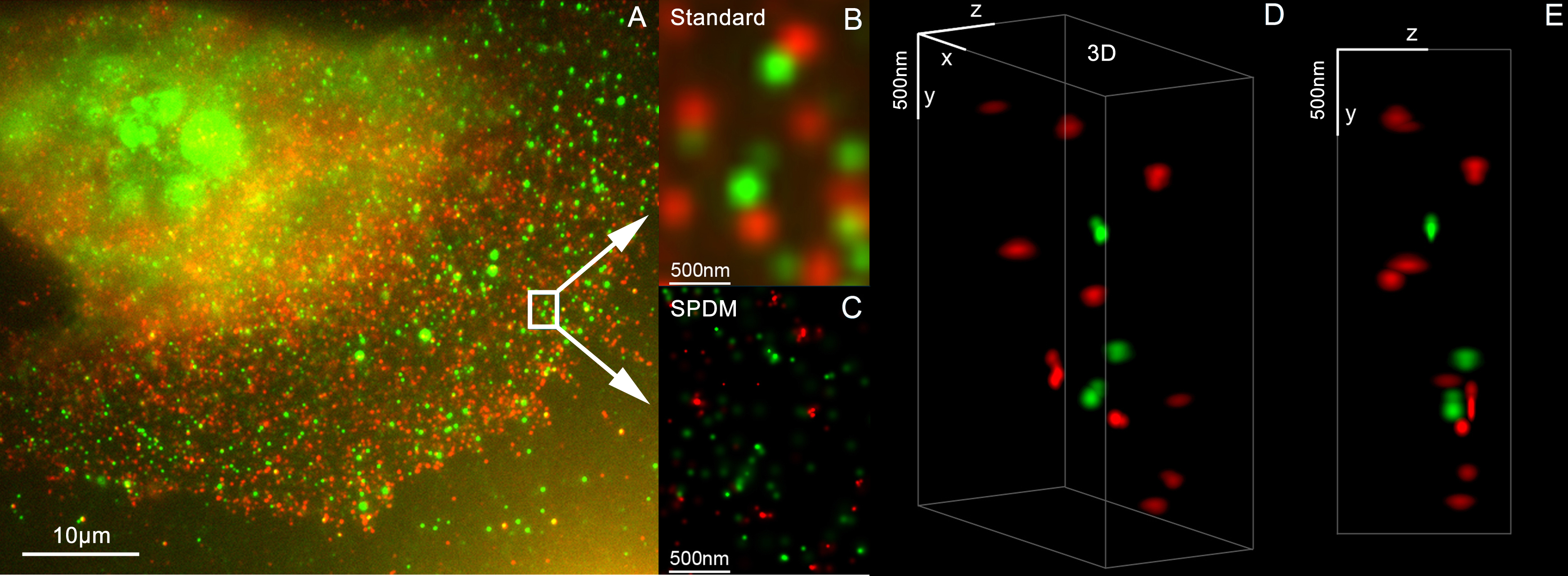
3D dual color super resolution microscopy with Her2 and Her3 in breast cells, standard dyes: Alexa 488, Alexa 568 LIMON

SPDM (spectral precision distance microscopy), the basic localization microscopy technology is a light optical process of fluorescence microscopy which allows position, distance and angle measurements on "optically isolated" particles (e.g. molecules) well below the theoretical limit of resolution for light microscopy. "Optically isolated" means that, at a given point in time, only a single particle/molecule within a region of a size determined by conventional optical resolution (typically approx. 200–250 nm diameter) is being registered. This is possible when molecules within such a region all carry different spectral markers (e.g. different colors or other usable differences in the light emission of different particles).

Many standard fluorescent dyes like GFP, Alexa dyes, Atto dyes, Cy2/Cy3 and fluorescein molecules can be used for localization microscopy, provided certain photo-physical conditions are present. Using this so-called SPDMphymod (physically modifiable fluorophores) technology, a single laser wavelength of suitable intensity is sufficient for nanoimaging.

==== 3D super resolution microscopy ====
3D super resolution microscopy with standard fluorescent dyes can be achieved by a combination of localization microscopy for standard fluorescent dyes SPDMphymod and structured illumination SMI.

==== STED ====
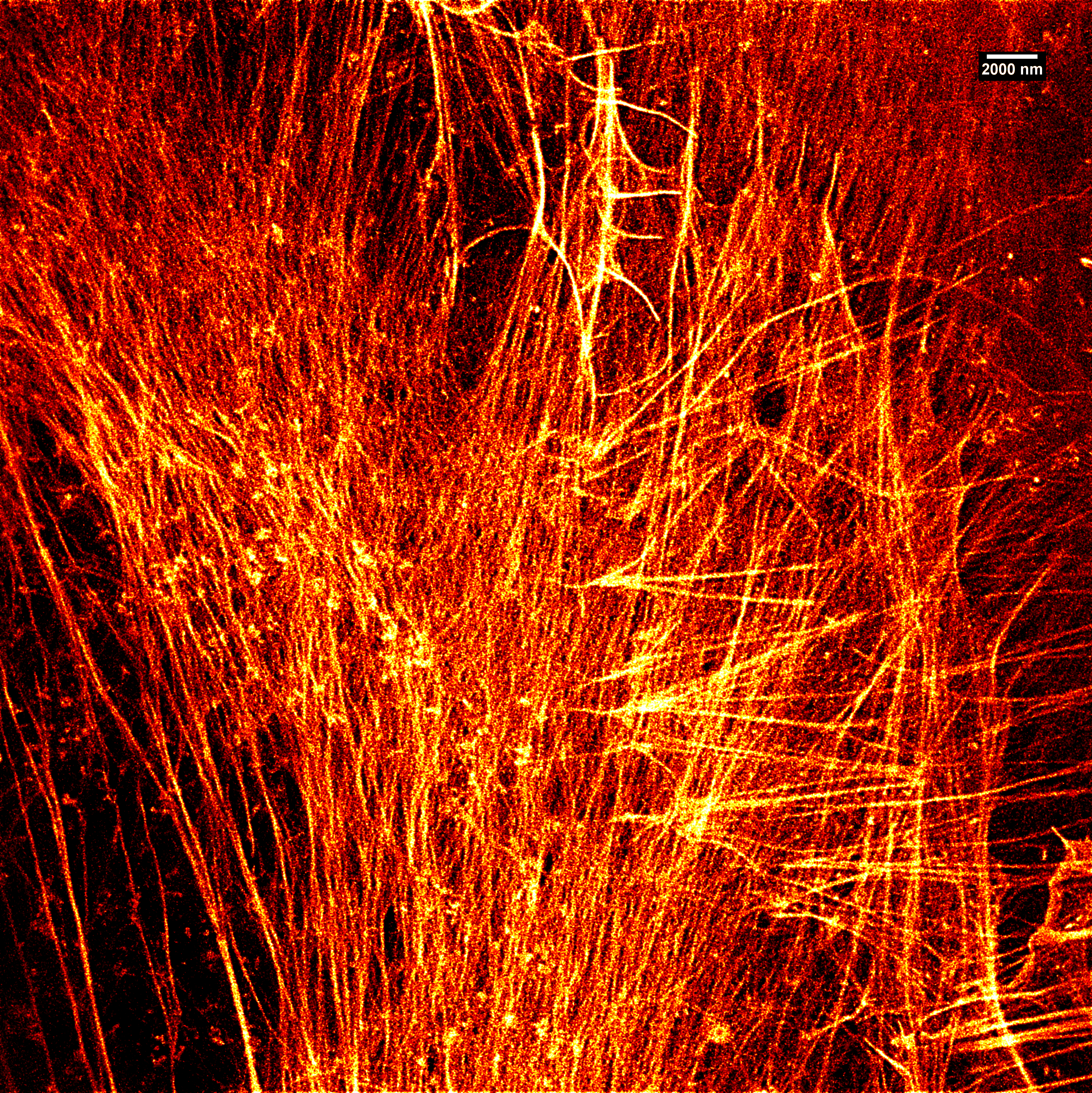
Stimulated emission depletion (STED) microscopy image of actin filaments within a cell

Stimulated emission depletion is a simple example of how higher resolution surpassing the diffraction limit is possible, but it has major limitations. STED is a fluorescence microscopy technique which uses a combination of light pulses to induce fluorescence in a small sub-population of fluorescent molecules in a sample. Each molecule produces a diffraction-limited spot of light in the image, and the centre of each of these spots corresponds to the location of the molecule. As the number of fluorescing molecules is low, the spots of light are unlikely to overlap and therefore can be placed accurately. This process is then repeated many times to generate the image. Stefan Hell of the Max Planck Institute for Biophysical Chemistry was awarded the 10th German Future Prize in 2006 and Nobel Prize for Chemistry in 2014 for his development of the STED microscope and associated methodologies.

== Alternatives ==
In order to overcome the limitations set by the diffraction limit of visible light other microscopes have been designed which use other waves.

- Atomic force microscope (AFM)
- Scanning electron microscope (SEM)
- Scanning ion-conductance microscopy (SICM)
- Scanning tunneling microscope (STM)
- Transmission electron microscopy (TEM)
- Ultraviolet microscope
- X-ray microscope

Higher frequency waves have limited interaction with matter, for example soft tissues are relatively transparent to X-rays resulting in distinct sources of contrast and different target applications.

The use of electrons and X-rays in place of light allows much higher resolution – the wavelength of the radiation is shorter so the diffraction limit is lower. To make the short-wavelength probe non-destructive, the atomic beam imaging system (atomic nanoscope) has been proposed and widely discussed in the literature, but it is not yet competitive with conventional imaging systems.

STM and AFM are scanning probe techniques using a small probe which is scanned over the sample surface. Resolution in these cases is limited by the size of the probe; micromachining techniques can produce probes with tip radii of 5–10 nm.

Additionally, methods such as electron or X-ray microscopy use a vacuum or partial vacuum, which limits their use for live and biological samples (with the exception of an environmental scanning electron microscope). The specimen chambers needed for all such instruments also limits sample size, and sample manipulation is more difficult. Color cannot be seen in images made by these methods, so some information is lost. They are however, essential when investigating molecular or atomic effects, such as age hardening in aluminium alloys, or the microstructure of polymers.

== See also ==
- Digital microscope
- Köhler illumination
- Microscope slide
