= List of pastry chefs =

This is a list of notable pastry chefs. A pastry chef is a station chef in a professional kitchen, skilled in the making of pastries, desserts and other baked goods. They are employed in large hotels, bistros, restaurants, bakeries, and some cafés.

== Pastry chefs ==
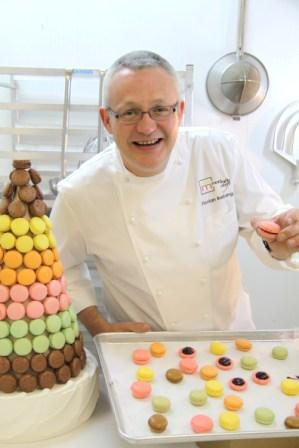
Florian Bellanger in 2010

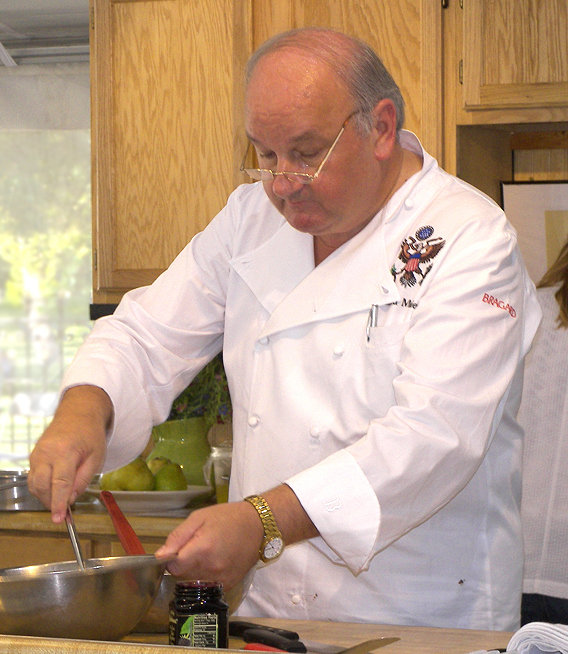
Roland Mesnier does a cooking demonstration at the 2007 Texas Book Festival.

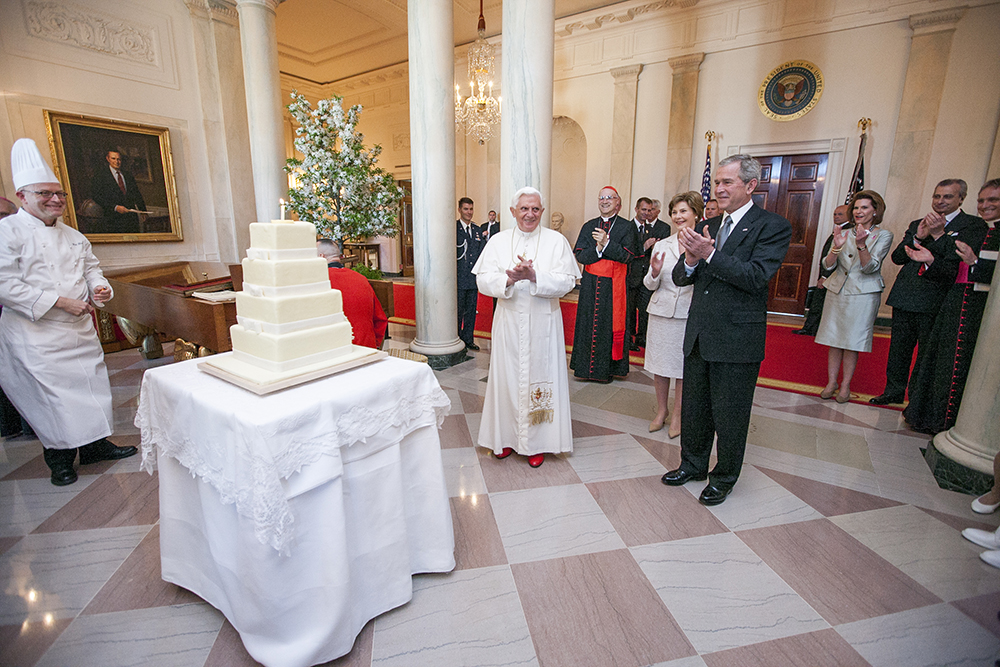
President George W. Bush and Mrs. Laura Bush lead the celebration of the 81st birthday of Pope Benedict XVI as he is presented with a cake by the White House Executive Pastry Chef, William Yosses (left).

- Auguste Escoffier
- Marie‑Antoine Carême
- Dominique Ansel
- Sadaharu Aoki
- Antonio Bachour
- Auzerais Bellamy
- Florian Bellanger
- Ron Ben-Israel
- Willem Berkhoff
- Wayne Harley Brachman
- Sébastien Canonne
- Philippe Conticini
- Cheryl Day
- Elizabeth Falkner
- Gale Gand
- Duff Goldman
- Carine Goren
- Shayne Greenman
- Cédric Grolet
- Amaury Guichon
- Tariq Hanna
- Maida Heatter
- Pierre Hermé
- Johnny Iuzzini
- Cheryl Koh
- Beulah Levy Ledner
- Alain LeNôtre
- Gaston Lenôtre
- Nicholas Lodge
- Norman Love
- Emily Luchetti
- Jean-Philippe Maury
- Roland Mesnier
- Ho Chi Minh
- Melissa Murphy
- Candace Nelson
- Ghaya Oliveira
- Anna Olson
- Pichet Ong
- François Payard
- Jacquy Pfeiffer
- Michelle Polzine
- Claire Ptak
- Marc Rivière
- Alain Roby
- Jordi Roca i Fontané
- Albert Roux
- Michel Roux
- S. G. Sender
- Sally Seymour
- Greggy Soriano
- Jean-Claude Szurdak
- Yves Thuriès
- Jacques Torres
- Christina Tosi
- Buddy Valastro
- Rudolph van Veen
- Bronwen Weber
- William Yosses
- Pierrick Boyer
- Shahrzad Shokouhivand
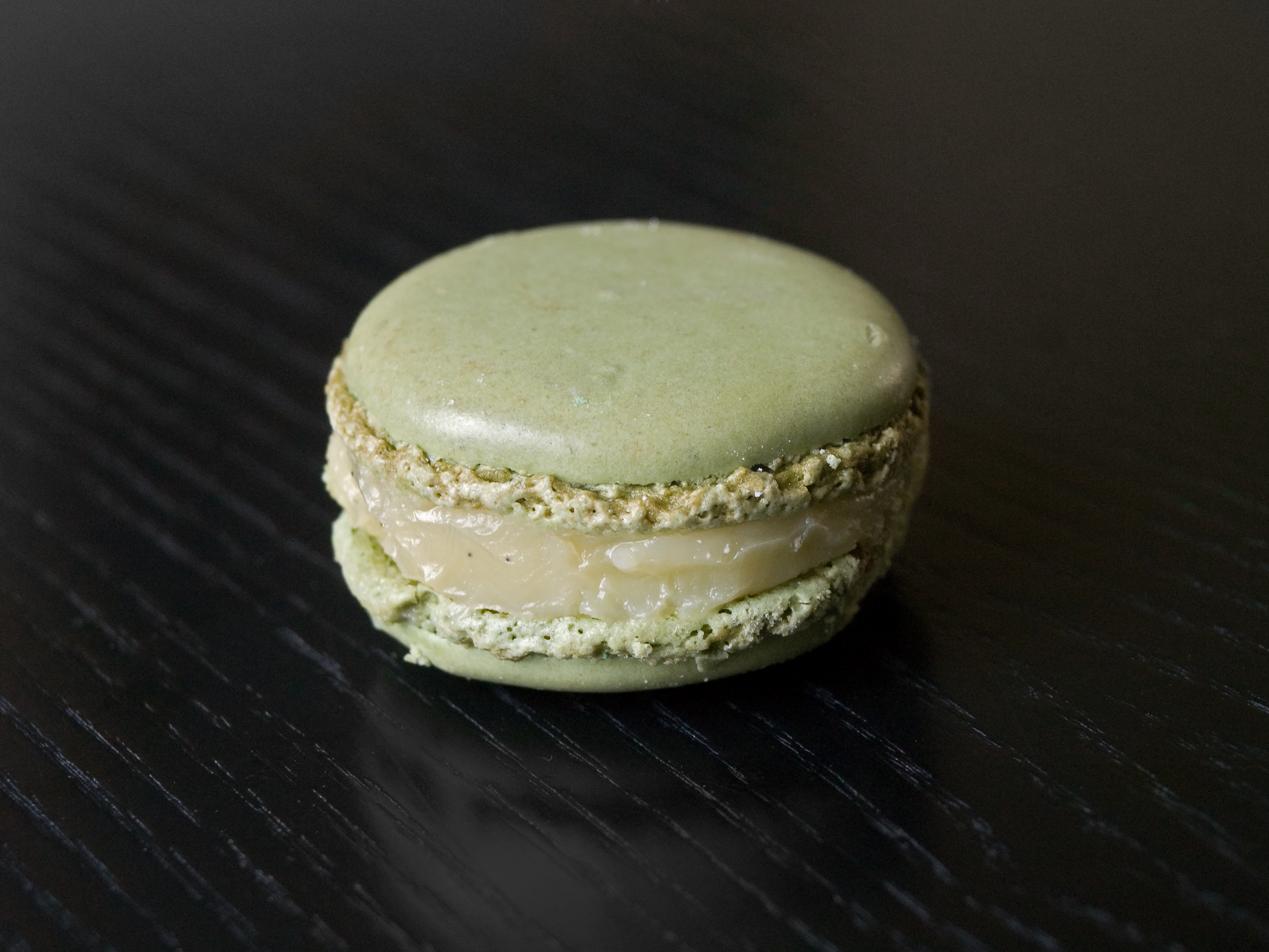
A Pierre Hermé "olive oil and vanilla" macaron

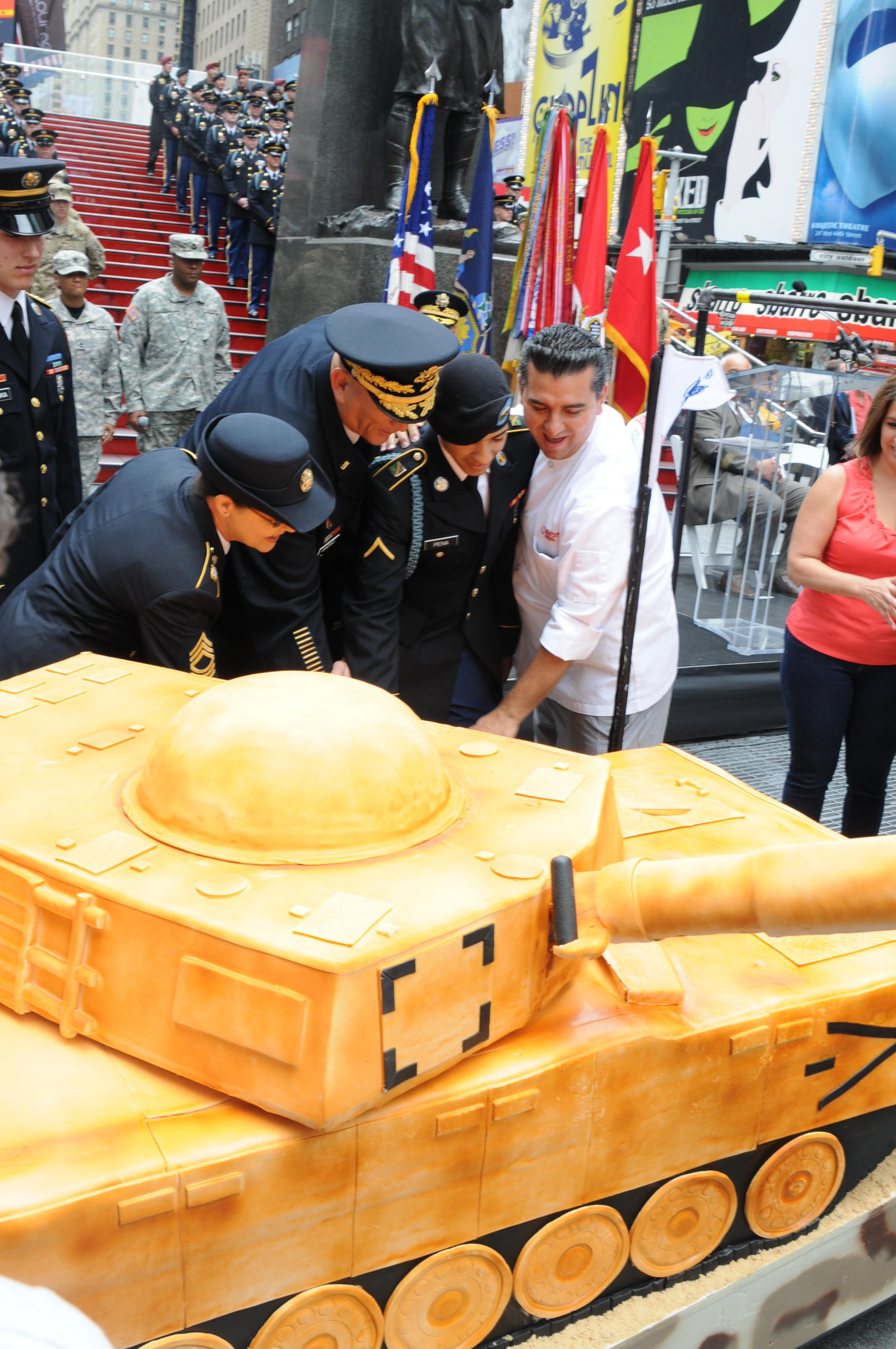
Buddy Valastro (right), General Raymond T. Odierno and other members of the United States Army in Times Square cutting a cake to celebrate the Army's 237th birthday in 2012

== See also ==
- List of bakers
- List of chefs
- White House Executive Pastry Chef
