= Bill Yosses =

American pastry chef

William Yosses
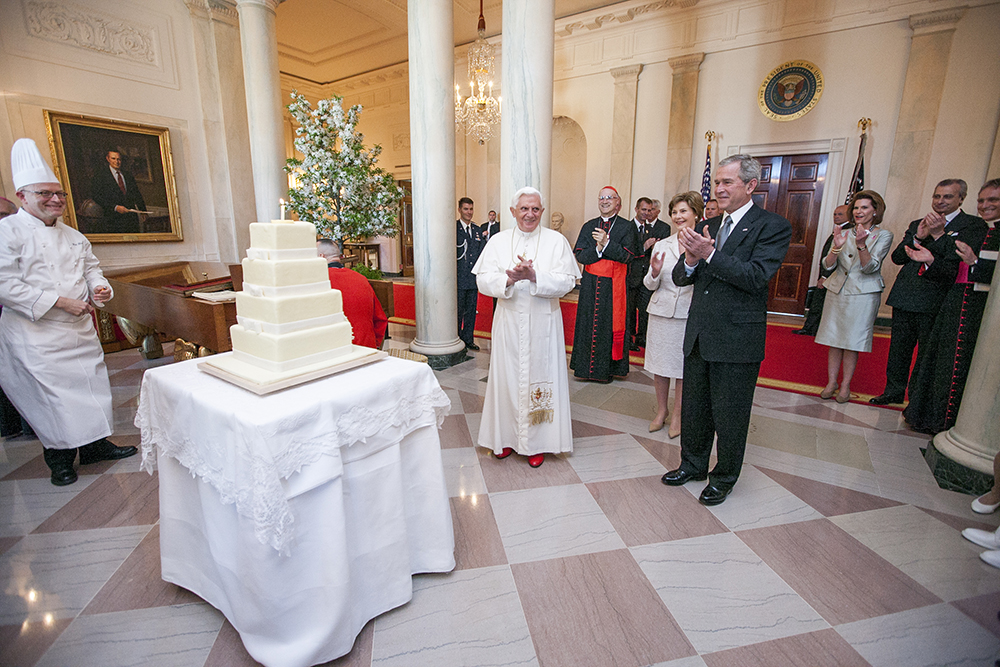
- President Bush leads a celebration of Pope Benedict XVI's birthday as Yosses (left) presents his cake.

White House executive pastry chef
- In office January 29, 2007 – June 2014
- President: George W. Bush; Barack Obama
- Preceded by: Thaddeus DuBois
- Succeeded by: Susie Morrison

Personal details
- Born: 1953 or 1954 (age 72–73)
- Education: New York City College of Technology; University of Toledo; Rutgers University

William Yosses (born 1953 or 1954) is an American chef who is best known as co-author of the book Desserts For Dummies and for being the White House executive pastry chef from 2007 to 2014. Yosses was the owner of the pastry company Perfect Pie, which was based in New York City.

== Early life ==
Yosses was born to Edward L. Yosses and Mary Driscoll Yosses. He grew up in Ohio. His mother was a baker, while his father worked as an accountant for the Libbey Owens Ford Glass Company.

Yosses earned his A.A.S. degree at the New York City College of Technology in hotel management, a bachelor's degree at the University of Toledo and a Master of Arts in French at Rutgers University.

== Career ==
Yosses traveled to France, where he received training from chefs Gaston Lenôtre and Pierre Hermé. He worked at Bouley and Montrachet alongside chef David Bouley for nearly 20 years, as well as the Polo and Tavern on the Green.

In 2007, Yosses was hired as White House Executive Pastry Chef by then-First Lady Laura Bush. In 2009, President Barack Obama said of Yosses, "Whatever pie you like, he will make it and it will be the best pie you have ever eaten." Obama has also nicknamed Yosses "the Crust Master".

Yosses resigned from his White House position in June 2014. He left his position to work on a new project focusing on "food literacy" by teaching young children and adults about eating better. The New York Times lede used the hook that Michelle Obama is "partly to blame" for her requests that Yosses make healthier food in smaller portions, but then went on to explain that this is because he found her to be "an inspiring boss," and his new project expands on the First Lady's Healthy Foods Initiative. He began replacing butter with fruit puree and sugar with honey and agave but stated, "I don't want to demonize cream, butter, sugar and eggs." Yosses called the departure "a bittersweet decision."

In response to claims that he was leaving because of the First Lady's demands, Yosses stated, "Not at all, no. We work together on improving — making desserts more delicious and more healthy. We're partners on that project." He recounts his experiences working in the White House in West Wingers: Stories from the Dream Chasers, Change Makers, and Hope Creators Inside the Obama White House, a collection of personal accounts by Obama Administration staffers.

In August 2018, Yosses joined the Four Seasons Restaurant as the pastry chef. The restaurant closed in 2019. Yosses was also the owner of the pastry company "Perfect Pie" based in New York City, which closed down in early 2020.

In 2021, it was announced that Yosses and Tamera Mowry-Housley would be hosting Baker's Dozen, a baking competition show for Hulu.

== Personal life ==
Yosses married Charlie Fabella Jr., a teacher, in 2011. In June 2014, he moved to New York to be with his husband.

== Books ==
- Bill Yosses; Alison Yates (1997). Desserts for Dummies. For Dummies. ISBN 978-0764550478.
- The Perfect Finish: Special Desserts for Every Occasion. New York: Norton, 2010. Co-written with Melissa Clark.
- T he Sweet Spot: Dialing Back Sugar and Amping Up Flavor. New York: Avery, 2017. Co-written with Peter Kaminsky.
- West Wingers: Stories from the Dream Chasers, Change Makers, and Hope Creators Inside the Obama White House. New York: Penguin, 2018. Contributed a chapter on his experiences working in the White House, especially during the Obama Administration.

== See also ==
- List of pastry chefs
