= Bonnay =

Bonnay may refer to:

== Surname ==
- Michel de Bonnay
- Yvette Bonnay

== Places ==
- Bonnay, Doubs, France
- Bonnay, Saône-et-Loire, France
- Bonnay, Somme, France
