= Marc Rivière (pastry chef) =

French pastry chef (born 1969)

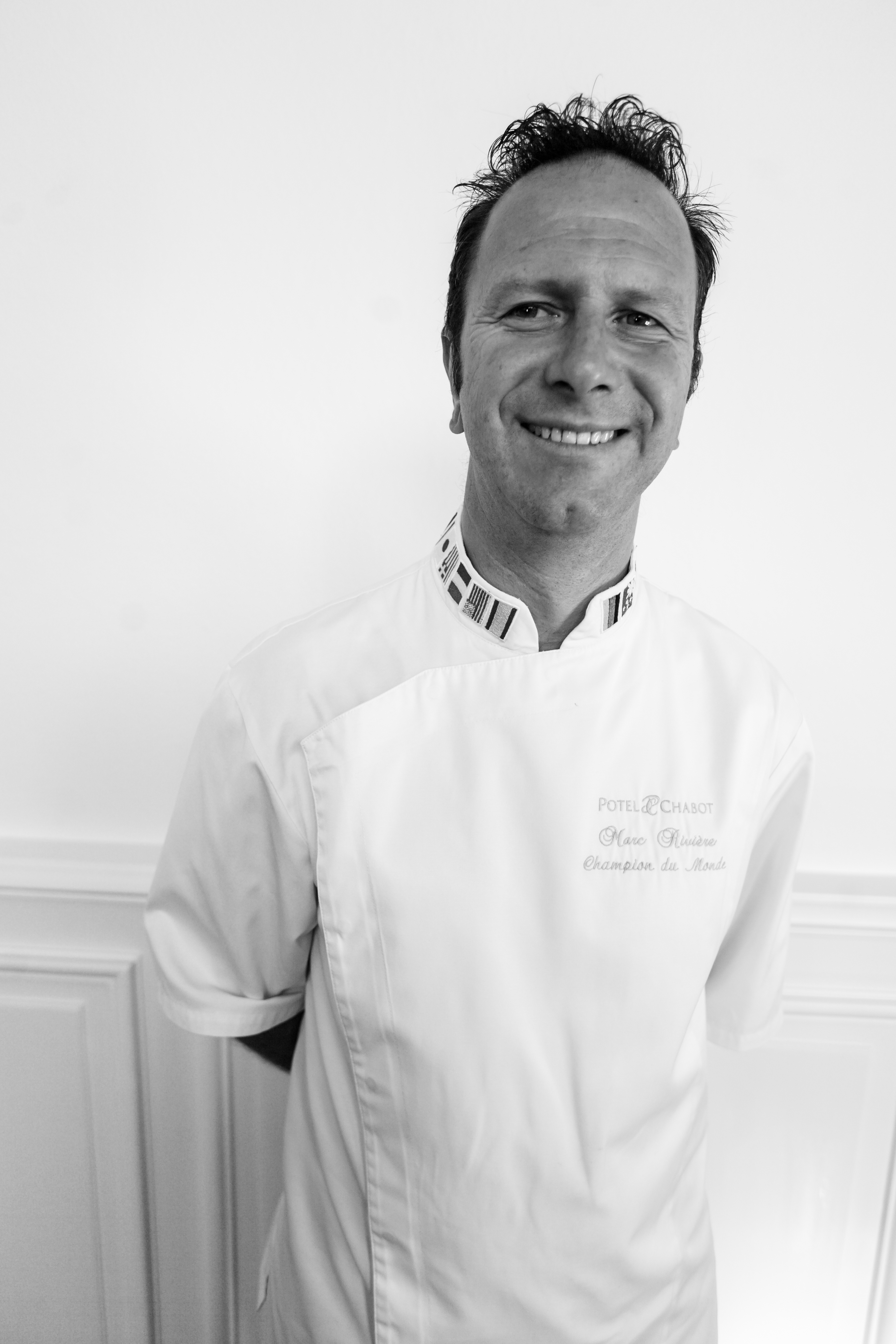
Marc Rivière's portrait 2013

Marc Rivière born on December 4, 1969, in Rennes, in the (Ille-et-Vilaine, 35) department of France. Is a French pastry chef at Potel et Chabot, whose pastry shop sits Chaillot, in Paris. He was crowned World Pastry Champion with the French team in 2009.

== Biography ==
Marc grew up in Rennes with his family, and it's with his grandmother Marguerite, a butcher, that he started cooking, including his first salted butter caramel crêpes. From the age of four, he showed intentions of becoming a baker.

He enrolled in baking classes at the Rennes trade school under Monsieur Joli. After graduating, he got a summer job under Chef Serge Nabucet who passed onto him his love for the profession. He worked there for three summers.

== Work experience ==
- 1990 1994 - Pastry Commis under Chef Pierre Hermé at Fauchon in Paris.
- 1991 1994 - Dessert Chef de Partie, second in command under Chef Ralph Edeler at Harrods, London.
- 1992 1994 - Second in command under Chef Frédéric Gernez at Yves Thuriès, in Cordes-sur-ciel (81).
- 1994 - Pastry Chef at Fouquet's, Paris in France.
- 1996 - Pastry Chef at Brigant(a caterer), now owned by Dalloyau.
- 1999 - Sous Chef, then Pastry Chef at Potel et Chabot à Paris.

== Contest ==
- 1991 - 5th in the Charles Proust Junior Contest.
- 1993 - 4th in the Charles Proust Contest and Prize for Outstanding Taste.
- 1994 - 3rd in the Mandarine Napoléon Contest and Prize for Outstanding Taste.
- 2008 - Is selected to be part of the French Team for the World Pastry Cup 2009.
- 2009 - World Pastry Champion with the French Team, also made up of Jérôme de Oliveira (captain) and Jérôme Langillier.

== See also ==
- List of pastry chefs
