= Jeunet =

Jeunet is a French surname. People with the name include:

- Claude-François Jeunet, French entomologist
- Jean-Pierre Jeunet (born 1953), French film director
- Jean-Paul Jeunet (born 1954), French chef
- Lou Jeunet, French screenwriter, director of Curiosa (film)
- Isabelle Jeunet, fictional character from the series Boardwalk Empire
