= Mesnier =

Mesnier is a French surname. Notable people with the surname include:

- Louis Mesnier (1884–1921), French footballer
- Paul Mesnier (1904–1988), French film director
- Roland Mesnier (1944–2022), French-American pastry chef and culinary writer
- Thomas Mesnier (born 1986), French physician and politician

== See also ==
- Raoul Mesnier du Ponsard
