= Sadaharu Aoki =

Japanese chef patissier (born 1968)

- 青木 定治
- Born: July 1, 1968 (age 58); Tokyo
- Education: Machida Cooking School
- Occupation: patissier

Sadaharu Aoki (青木 定治, Aoki Sadaharu; born 1 July 1968) is a Japanese chef patissier at the pâtisserie Sadaharu Aoki in Paris, France. He is known for using traditional Japanese ingredients and flavors in French-style pastries. His style is defined as a combination of minimalistic aesthetics with rigorous French techniques. He is also known as a food consultant for Yumeiro Pâtissière manga, as claimed by the series author Natsumi Matsumoto.

== Biography ==
After having graduated from Machida cooking School in Machida, Tokyo, Aoki worked at Patisserie Chandon in Tokyo. In 1991, he moved to France where he began working at Jean Millet's and Pierre Couderc's restaurants in Paris. He also worked at three Michelin star chef, Frédy Girardet's restaurant in Switzerland.

In 1998, Aoki opened his first atelier in the 7th arrondissement of Paris which, in 1999, he moved to the 13th arrondissement of Paris. In this atelier, he began to make pastries for tea rooms, restaurants, hotels and receptions. He also began delivering his pastries to fashion brands such as Kenzo, Yohji Yamamoto, Chanel, Ungaro, and Christian Dior during the Paris Collection. In 1999, Aoki also took responsibility of the French office in the All Japan Confectionery Associations.

In 2003, he opened his second boutique in the 5th arrondissement of Paris and in 2004, he opened another boutique in the Lafayette Gourmet section of French department store, Galeries Lafayette.

Then in 2005, he was requested by the Japanese airline All Nippon Airways to serve desserts for its business class flights departing from Paris. It was in March 2005 that he opened his first boutique in Japan in Marunouchi, Tokyo. He opened his second Tokyo boutique in 2006 at the Isetan department store in Shinjuku, Tokyo.

In 2011, he was nominated as the Patissier of the Year by Gilles Pudlowski. In this year, Aoki also collaborated with 3 Michelin Star chef, Anne-Sophie Pic, to participate in the Salon du Chocolat. In 2013, Aoki participated again in the Salon du Chocolat and was one of the 12 chocolatiers to win the highest ratings.
