= Saint-Ythaire =

Commune in Saône-et-Loire, France

- Part of Bonnay-Saint-Ythaire
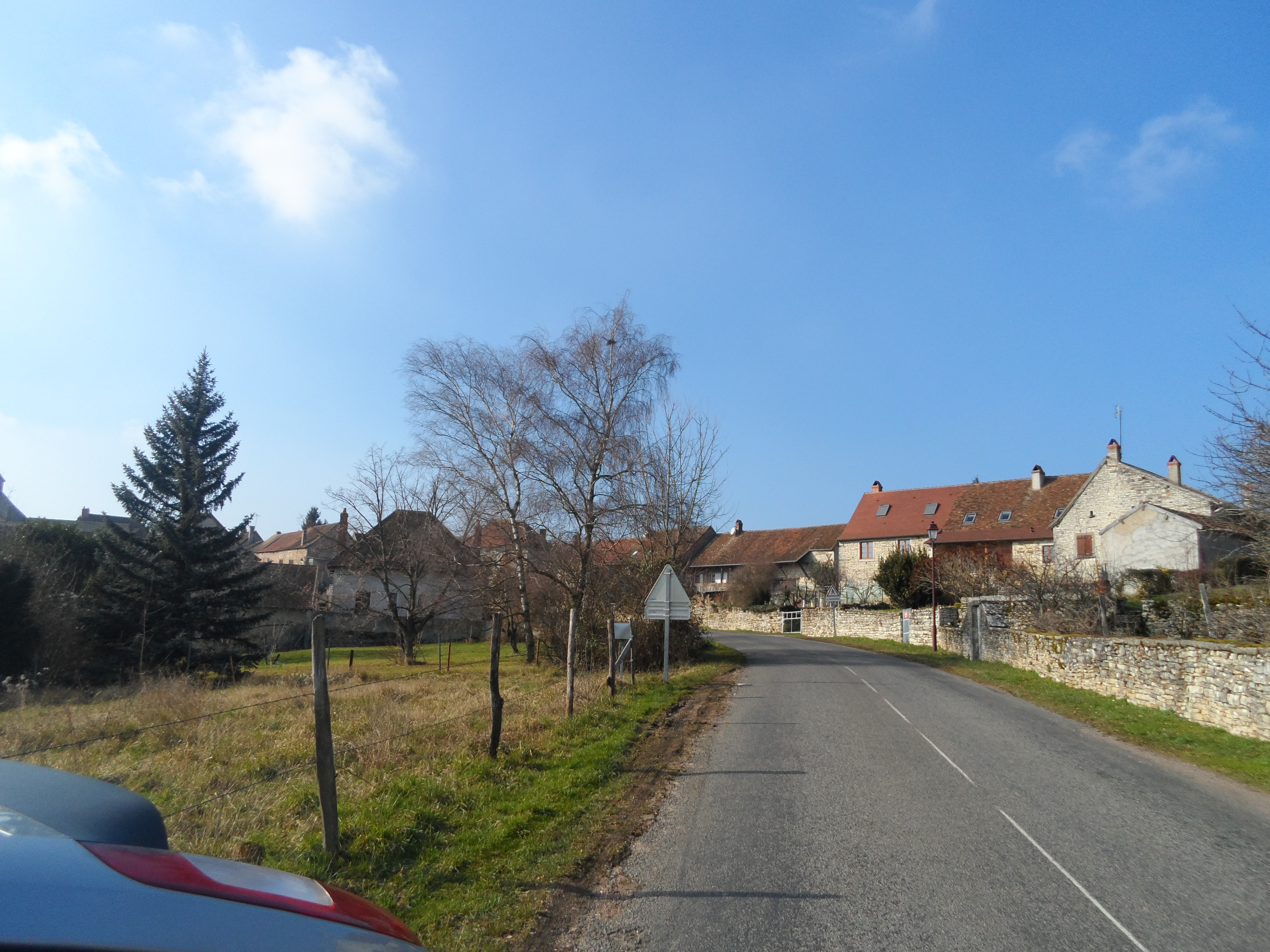
- A general view of Saint-Ythaire

- Coat of arms
- Location of Saint-Ythaire
- Location within France Location within Bourgogne-Franche-Comté
- Coordinates: 46°34′10″N 4°36′39″E
- Country: France
- Region: Bourgogne-Franche-Comté
- Department: Saône-et-Loire
- Arrondissement: Mâcon
- Canton: Cluny
- Commune: Bonnay-Saint-Ythaire
- Area^{1}: 9.3 km^{2} (3.6 sq mi)
- Elevation: 380 m (1,250 ft)
- Highest elevation: 411 m (1,348 ft)
- Lowest elevation: 243 m (797 ft)
- Population (2022): 131
  - Density: 14/km^{2} (36/sq mi)
- Time zone: UTC+01:00 (CET)
  - Summer (DST): UTC+02:00 (CEST)
- Postal code: 71460
- ^{1} French Land Register data, which excludes lakes, ponds, glaciers > 1 km^{2} (0.386 sq mi or 247 acres) and river estuaries.

Saint-Ythaire (French pronunciation: [sɛ̃t‿itɛʁ]) is a former commune in the Saône-et-Loire department in the region of Bourgogne-Franche-Comté in eastern France. On 1 January 2023, it was merged into the new commune of Bonnay-Saint-Ythaire.

== See also ==
- Communes of the Saône-et-Loire department
