= Willem Berkhoff =

Willem Berkhoff (Varsseveld, the Netherlands 12 June 1863 – Amsterdam, the Netherlands 12 January 1953) was a pastry chef who became the first chairman of the board of directors of the first Dutch Vocational School for Pastry Chefs, established in 1924 in Amsterdam and since 1956 named "De Berkhoff". Berkhoff became well known when he presented a traditional English wedding cake to Queen Wilhelmina (1880–1962) and Prince Henry (1876–1934) on the occasion of their marriage in 1901. Henceforth, the wedding cake became standard issue in Dutch wedding festivities. His "Pâtisserie and Refreshment Room" in the Leidsestraat was a household word in and outside Amsterdam, for over seventyfive years.

== Training ==
The son of Cornelis Berkhoff (1821–1913) and Harmina Kreeftenberg (1834–1913), Berkhoff belonged to a family of bakers. His father, grandfather and great-grandfather were not only bread bakers, but following the custom of their time, they specialized in other products as well, such as gingerbread, sponge cake and pastry making. Berkhoff decided on a career as a Pastry Chef. After 1879 he began developing and enhancing his skills by starting apprenticeships with various well-known konditoreis and pâtisseries in Dresden, Zurich and Paris. For the final stage of his education, organized by himself, as a Pastry Chef, he trained at Gerstner's in Vienna. The konditorei was considered thé top among pâtissiers and was Royal Warrant Holder of the Imperial House of Habsburg.

== Eerste Constantijn Huygensstraat 104 en Leidsestraat 46 ==
After having worked for some years as a shop assistant in Amsterdam, Berkhoff opened his own pastry shop in the Eerste Constantijn Huygensstraat 104 in 1893. As Confiseur-Cuisiner, Berkhoff aimed at the more sophisticated pastry work. He further started his own catering business, serving lunches, dinners and suppers to private people. In 1908 he served dinner for 450 persons in the Concert Hall, for the International Congress of Woman Suffrage. In 1906 Berkhoff opened a second pastry shop in the Leidsestraat 46. The adjoining "Refreshment Room" had international stature and was widely known among the better-off classes. In 1944 the business was sold to Kees Goetheer, under whose supervision it continued until 1985 as "Berkhoff's Pâtisserie and Tearoom".

== Queen Wilhelmina's wedding cake ==
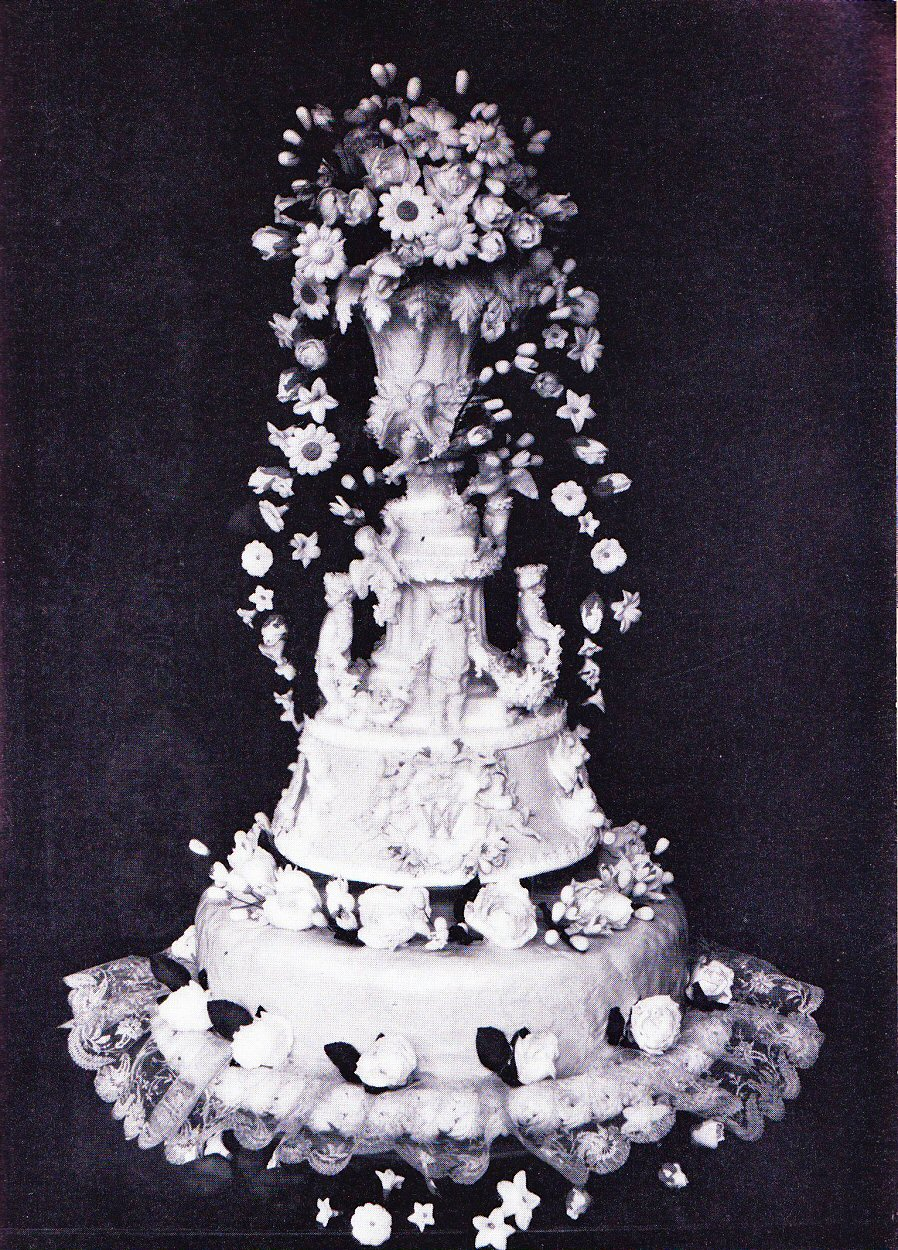
Wedding cake made by Willem Berkhoff for the occasion of the marriage of Queen Wilhelmina and Prince Henry on 7 February 1901.

On the occasion of the marriage of Queen Wilhelmina (1880–1962) and Prince Henry (1876–1934) in 1901, Berkhoff took the initiative of presenting a wedding cake to the royal couple. In England in the second half of the nineteenth century, the royal wedding cake was considered as the "flagship of British pastry enterprise", but in the Netherlands of the time the custom was unknown. Berkhoff's presentation of a wedding cake to the royal couple gained him ánd the craft of Pâtissier fame. The wedding cake for the marriage of Princess Juliana and Prince Bernhard in 1937, was made by J. Jongert, teacher at the NADPC Vocational School for Pastry Chefs "De Berkhoff".

== NADPC Vocational School for Pastry Chefs "De Berkhoff" ==
As a member of the National Association of Dutch Pastry Chefs (NADPC) established in 1885 in Amsterdam, Berkhoff committed himself to the organization of an apprentice system for future pastry chefs, which had been lacking up till then. After its initial success, the in 1907 established training system and its regulations had proven to be substandard. Meanwhile, the membership figure of the NADPC had nationwide increased sharply, so the board of directors was split into a central board of directors and a local division "Amsterdam", under the supervision of Berkhoff. In this quality Berkhoff became the driving force behind the start of a National Vocational School for Pastry Chefs in Amsterdam, the first of its kind in Europe.

In 1924, the National Vocational School for Pastry Chefs, supported by grants, both from the National Government and the Amsterdam Local Council, opened its doors on Quellijnstraat 80. In this purpose-built building, students were not only taught vocationally based skills, but also Dutch and modern languages, bookkeeping, commercial arithmetic, penmanship and design. In its senior forms subjects taught, were: food science, legal knowledge, financial management and business management. The school-building also housed the historical collection of the NADPC, which consisted of literature, cookery books, menus and tools.

From 1924 to 1933 Berkhoff would act as chairman of the school's board of governors. After the school had moved to its present location on the Wibautstraat 220–222 in 1956, its name was changed into "De Berkhoff", in honour of its chairman. As chairman of the central board of directors of the NADPC (1927–1934), and editor of the trade journal The Pastry Shop (1935–1942), Berkhoff continued to play an important role in Pâtissiers circles for a long time. His efforts to achieve international cooperation among pâtissiers, were rewarded by his appointments as honorary member of the Belgian and French sister organisations.

== Royal Honours ==
- Knight of the Order of Orange-Nassau (1933)
