= Pierrick Boyer =

French pastry chef (born 1974)

- Born: 22 July 1974 (age 52); Valognes
- Occupation: Pastry chef

Pierrick Boyer (born 22 July 1974 in Valognes) is a French pastry chef.

== Career ==
In 1989, Pierrick Boyer started a pre-apprenticeship in Feucherolles in Yvelines France and from 1990 to 1992 in Saint Nom La Breteche.

In 1992, he started work at Les Compagnons Du Devoir with Strabourg, then 1993 Brussel, The French Army & United Nation Peace Keeping Corp, followed by deployment in Split Croatia in 1995.

In 1996, Boyer returned to Les Compagnons in Reims and 1997 in Bordeaux. He also had a short 6 months work for Club Med in Italy, Livorno Donoratico. He started to work in a French pâtisserie in Palm Dessert in 1997.

In 2002, he joined the pastry department of the Ritz Carlton in Boston. Boyer also worked at the Plaza Athenee in Paris as Sous Pastry Chef, under Christophe Michalak.

In July 2007, Boyer opened the famed Le Petit Gateau Patisserie in Melbourne, Australia.

He also appeared on the Cake Bake & Sweets Show 2015 in Sydney and Melbourne and at Regional Tastes Festival at Eynesbury in 2016.

In May 2018, Boyer opened his namesake establishment, Pierrick Boyer Cafe and Patisserie and rebranded in 2019 to Reverie Cafe, headquartered in Prahran with a retail outlet at Doncaster Westfield.

== Awards ==
In 2017, he was awarded the Gault & Millau Pastry Chef of the Year award.

On 24 June 2024, Pierrick Boyer has been honoured by the French government, French Ambassador in Australia, Pierre-Andre Imbert as the Chevalier Du Merite Agricole - French Australian Pastry Chef.

Before his spectacular career in Australia as a French pastry chef, in 1995 he was awarded medal for his services in the French Army (National defence medal) and with the United Nation in Croatia (UNPROFOR)

== Charity work ==
He is an ambassador of RSPCA Victoria. He took part in the inaugural Asia In South Australia 2015 Charity Dinner and Sakai in Ginza Miyako Charity Dinner.
