= Auzerais Bellamy =

American chef

- Education: Johnson & Wales University
- Occupation: Pastry chef

Auzerais Bellamy is an African-American pastry chef who established and owns the bakery Blondery, in Brooklyn, New York.

== Early life and education ==
Bellamy was raised in the San Francisco Bay Area, and graduated from the Johnson & Wales University's College of Culinary Arts in 2012.

== Career ==
Bellamy founded and owns the bakery Blondery, in Brooklyn. According to Food & Wine, "Her limited-release bakery Blondery was founded with a mission in mind: to create a supportive workplace for other people of color in hospitality, and empower them to thrive in an industry that hasn't historically been hospitable." Previously, she was an apprentice at Thomas Keller's restaurant The French Laundry, and worked at Bouchon Bakery. She started at the location in Yountville, California, before transferring to the Rockefeller Center location. Bellamy launched Blondery as an e-commerce site in 2018. She has a YouTube channel, on which she offers baking and business recommendations.

== Personal life ==
Bellamy resides in Yonkers, New York, as of 2022.

== See also ==
- List of pastry chefs
