= Bonnay-Saint-Ythaire =

- Commune
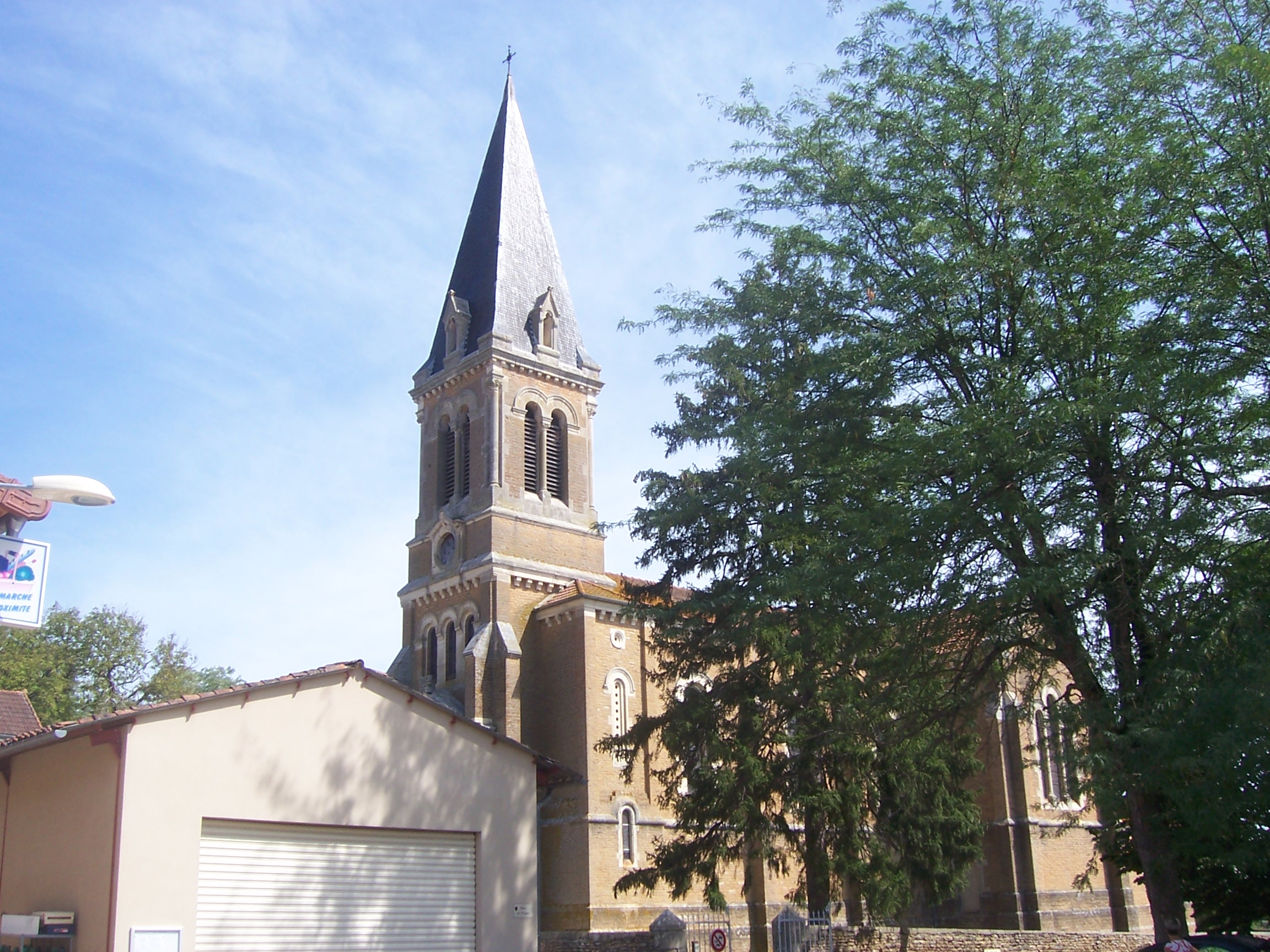
- The church in Bonnay
- Location of Bonnay-Saint-Ythaire
- Location within France Location within Bourgogne-Franche-Comté
- Coordinates: 46°33′03″N 4°37′21″E
- Country: France
- Region: Bourgogne-Franche-Comté
- Department: Saône-et-Loire
- Arrondissement: Mâcon
- Canton: Cluny
- Intercommunality: CC Clunisois

Government
  - Mayor (2023–2026): Christophe Parat
- Area^{1}: 21.29 km^{2} (8.22 sq mi)
- Highest elevation: 411 m (1,348 ft)
- Lowest elevation: 197 m (646 ft)
- Population (2023): 449
  - Density: 21.1/km^{2} (54.6/sq mi)
- Time zone: UTC+01:00 (CET)
  - Summer (DST): UTC+02:00 (CEST)
- INSEE/Postal code: 71042 /71460
- ^{1} French Land Register data, which excludes lakes, ponds, glaciers > 1 km^{2} (0.386 sq mi or 247 acres) and river estuaries.

Bonnay-Saint-Ythaire (French pronunciation: [bɔnɛ sɛ̃t‿itɛʁ]) is a commune in the Saône-et-Loire department in the region of Bourgogne-Franche-Comté in eastern France. It was established as a commune nouvelle on 1 January 2023 from the merger of the communes of Bonnay and Saint-Ythaire.

== See also ==
- Communes of the Saône-et-Loire department
