= White House executive pastry chef =

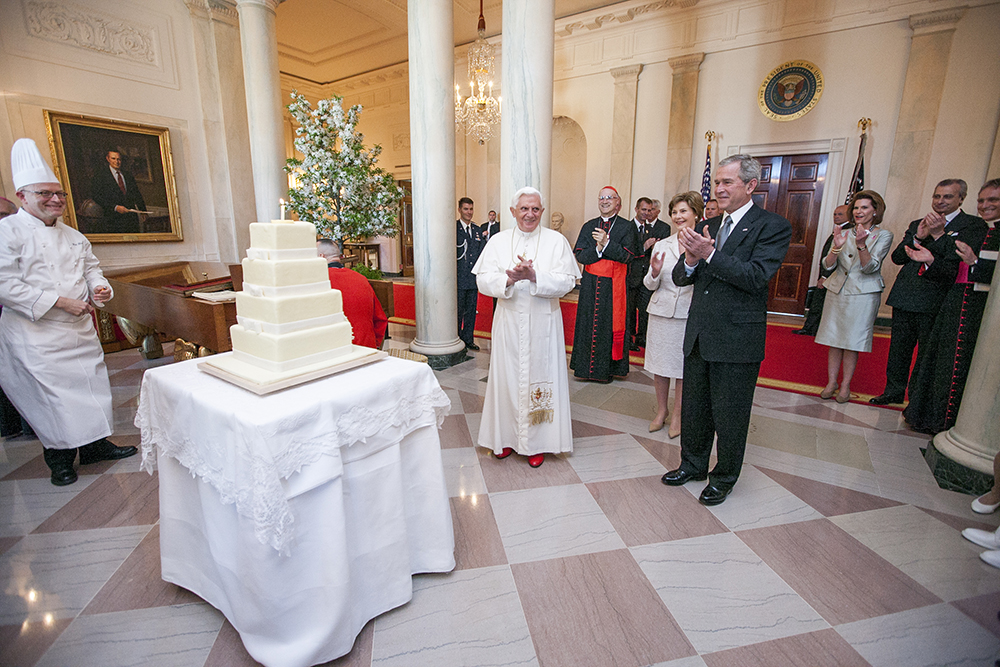
President George W. Bush and Mrs. Laura Bush lead the celebration of the 81st birthday of Pope Benedict XVI as he's presented a cake by the White House executive pastry chef, William Yosses (left).

The White House executive pastry chef is responsible for the planning, managing and preparing of all desserts and pastries served at the White House, the official residence of the president of the United States. This includes state dinners, official dinners, and private entertaining by the first family.

The executive pastry chef works separately from the White House executive chef and reports directly to the chief usher. She works in coordination with these two, as well as the White House social secretary, and the first lady for all events and dinners. The executive pastry chef serves at the first lady's pleasure and is appointed, or reappointed, by each administration.

The White House Executive Pastry Chef since 2025 is Carlo Figarella.

== List of executive pastry chefs ==
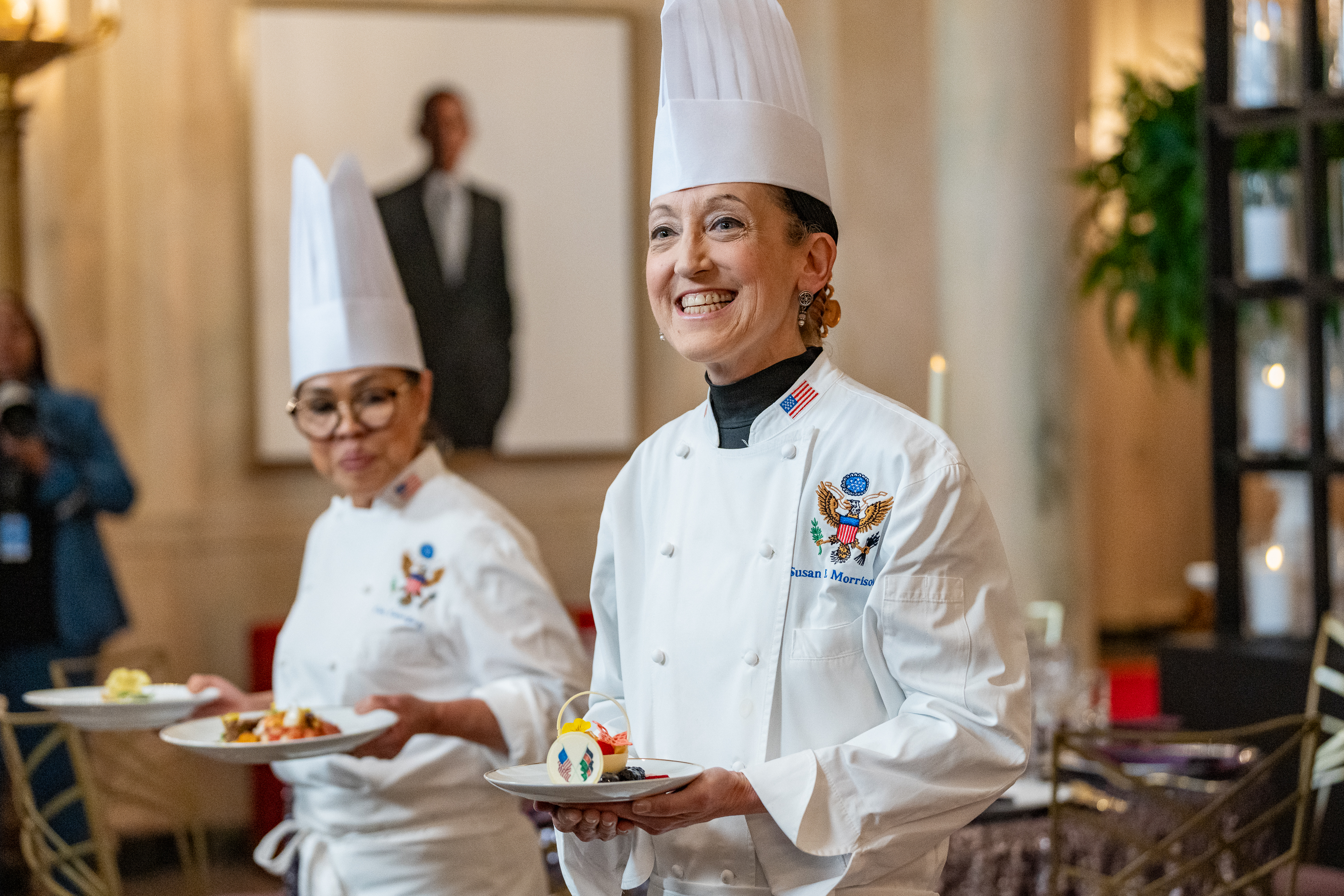
Susie Morrison, 2024

- Heinz Bender, February 1968–January 1979
- Albert Kumin, February 1, 1979–December 31, 1979
- Roland Mesnier, 1980–2004
- Thaddeus DuBois, 2004–2006
- Bill Yosses, 2007–2014
- Susan E. "Susie" Morrison, 2014–2025
- Carlo Figarella, from 2025

== See also ==
- List of pastry chefs
