= Michelle Polzine =

American pastry chef and cookbook author

Michelle Polzine is an American pastry chef, author, and former owner of the 20th Century Café in San Francisco, California.

== Biography ==
Polzine was born in November, 1969 and was raised in Southern California. Starting at age 19 she worked as a political activist, first in Portland, Oregon on behalf of an environmental organization, then later for a women's clinic based in San Francisco. In 1991, at the age of 22, Polzine relocated to North Carolina, and entered the restaurant industry as a dishwasher before eventually being offered positions preparing food. After developing skills as a baker at several restaurants in Durham and Chapel Hill, Polzine returned to San Francisco to continue her culinary career in 2002.

Polzine opened the 20th Century Café, which focused on her interpretation of Eastern and Central European baked goods, in San Francisco in 2013. She authored the cookbook Baking at the 20th Century Cafe: Iconic European Desserts from Linzer Torte to Honey Cake, which was published in 2020.

Polzine was diagnosed with, and treated for, clear cell carcinoma in 2020. Citing both her recovery from this procedure and the negative effects of the COVID-19 pandemic on the food industry, Polzine permanently closed the 20th Century Café in 2020.

== Personal life ==
Polzine has been noted for her vintage style, favoring fashions from the 1930s to 1950s. She is married to Franz Kunst and currently resides in San Francisco.

== Awards ==
Polzine was a semi-finalist for the James Beard Foundation's Outstanding Pastry Chef Award in 2010, 2018, and 2019.
