= Cédric Grolet =

French pastry chef (born 1985)

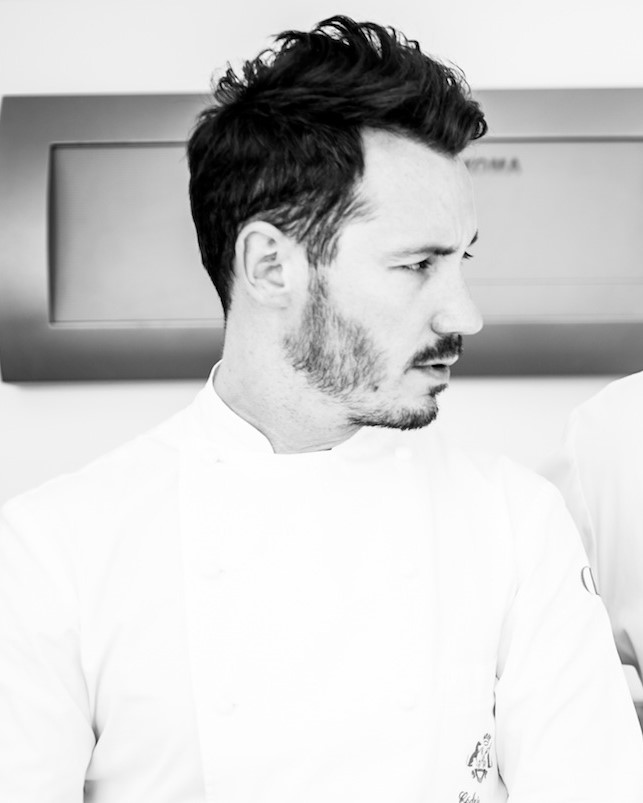
- Grolet in 2016
- Born: 28 August 1985 (age 41); Firminy, France
- Known for: Pastry, dessert
- Website: https://cedric-grolet.com

Cédric Grolet (born 28 August 1985, Firminy, France) is a French pastry chef. He is the executive pastry chef at Le Meurice, in Paris, part of the Dorchester Collection.

Grolet's pastries focus on fruits and the reinterpretation of traditional French desserts. He is known for creating desserts that have a likeness to the fruits from which they're made. In order to achieve this effect, Grolet molds a thin shell of white chocolate and airbrushes it to replicate the appearance and texture of fruits such as lemons, apples, and figs. Grolet is also the author of Fruits, a cookbook that explores his fruit-based desserts.

In March 2018, he opened his first pastry shop within Le Meurice in Paris. Grolet opened a second shop in Paris, Cedric Grolet Opéra, a third shop in London, Cedric Grolet at the Berkeley, (2022) and a fourth shop in Singapore (2023). In 2022, Cédric appeared on PastryClass with his first-ever online class.

== Background ==
At age 21, Cédric moved to Paris to work at Fauchon, a French gourmet food producer. In 2011, after working at Fauchon for six years and training under Christophe Adam, he joined the team at the luxury hotel Le Meurice. In 2013, he was named the executive pastry chef at Le Meurice.

== Awards ==
- 2015, Best Pastry Chef of the Year, Le Chef Magazine
- 2016, Relais Desserts Award for Best Pastry Chef
- 2017, Omnivore Pastry Award
- 2017, World Best Pastry Chef, "Les Grandes Tables du Monde"
- 2018, Best Pastry Chef, Gault&Millau
- 2018, Best Pastry Chef, The World's 50 Best Restaurants

== Bibliography ==
- Grolet, Cedric (2017). Fruits. LEC communication (A.Ducasse). ISBN 9782841239443.
- Grolet, Cedric (2020). Opera Patisserie. Ducasse Édition. ISBN 978-2379450464.
