= Cheryl Day =

American pastry chef, baker and author

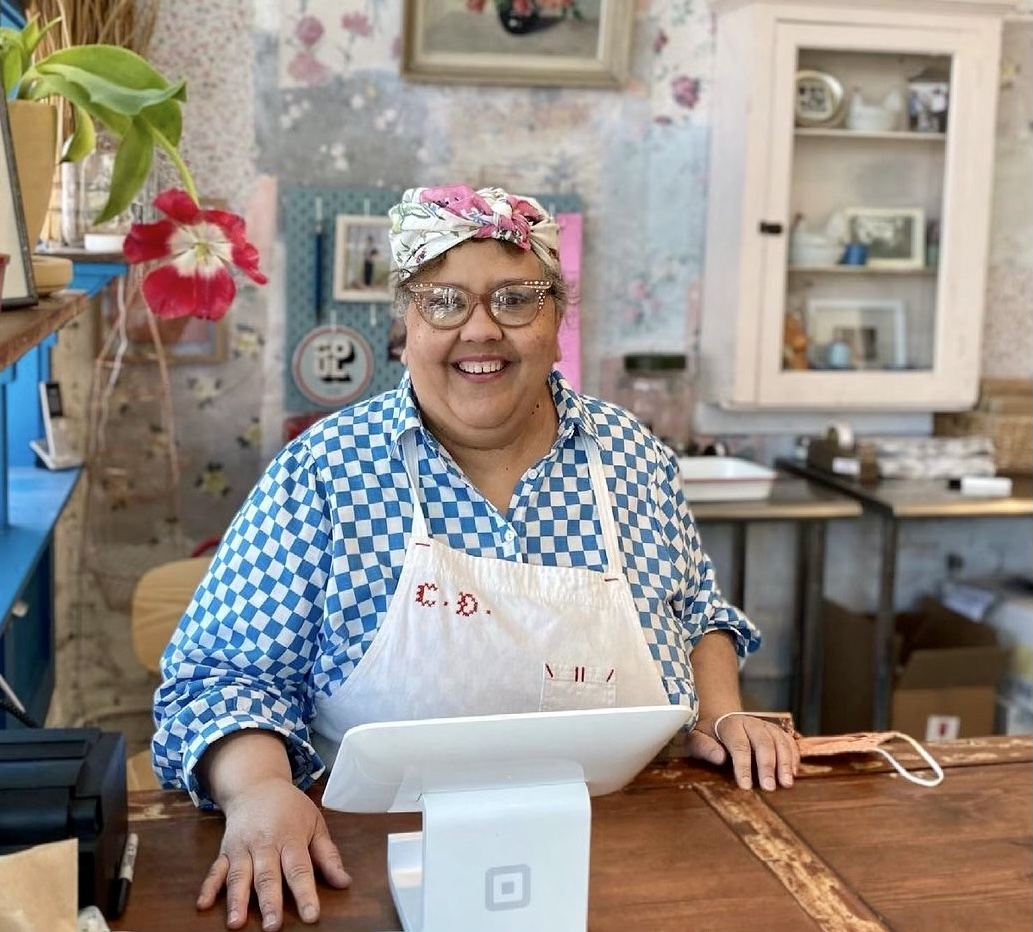
- Born: 1961 (age 64–65); Savannah, Georgia
- Occupation: Pastry Chef
- Years active: 20 years

Cheryl Day (born 1961) is a baker and author who is owner of Back in the Day Bakery in Savannah, Georgia, and co-founder of Southern Restaurants for Racial Justice. She is the author of two best-selling cookbooks, written with her husband Griff Day. In 2015 she was a semi-finalist for the James Beard Awards in the category of Outstanding Baker.

== Biography ==
Day was born in 1961. Her great-great-grandmother, Hannah Queen Grubbs, was an enslaved pastry chef noted for her baking, especially her pies and her frostings. This connection Day said, makes her work feel "more important somehow". Her grandmother taught her to bake, during the summers that Day spent staying with her in Alabama. She founded Back in the Day Bakery in 2002, and as of 2020 co-ran the business with her husband, Griff.

Day and her husband have co-written two best-selling cookbooks. The first book was entitled The Back in the Day Bakery Cookbook, which was published in 2012 and was a New York Times best-seller. The second book, Back in the Day Bakery Made with Love, was published in 2015 and records some of the most popular recipes made at the bakery, such as Alabama Lane Cake, Coca-Cola Cake and caramel cake.

In 2015, Day was a semi-finalist in the James Beard Awards in the category of Outstanding Baker. In 2016 Cathy Barrow, writing for the Washington Post, described Day's buttermilk biscuit as the best in Savannah. Day's biscuits are made in their hundreds by hand, every day.

In March 2020, Back in the Day Bakery closed due to the COVID-19 pandemic; it re-opened in June 2020 providing a walk-up services, as well as nationwide delivery for certain baked goods. In July 2020, Back in the Day Bakery was a recipient of a $25,000 prize donated by Discover Card, to support Black-owned business. She is a co-founder of Southern Restaurants for Racial Justice (SRRJ), along with Lisa Marie Donovan and Sarah O’Brien, an organisation which advocates for workers of colour in the food industry.

Her 2021 cookbook, Cheryl Day's Treasury of Southern Baking, was nominated for a 2022 James Beard Award, this time in the Baking and Desserts category.

== Publications ==
- The Back in the Day Bakery Cookbook (Artisan Books, 2012)
- Made with Love (Artisan Books, 2015)
- Cheryl Day's Treasury of Southern Baking (Artisan Books, 2021)
