= Claude-François Jeunet =

French entomologist

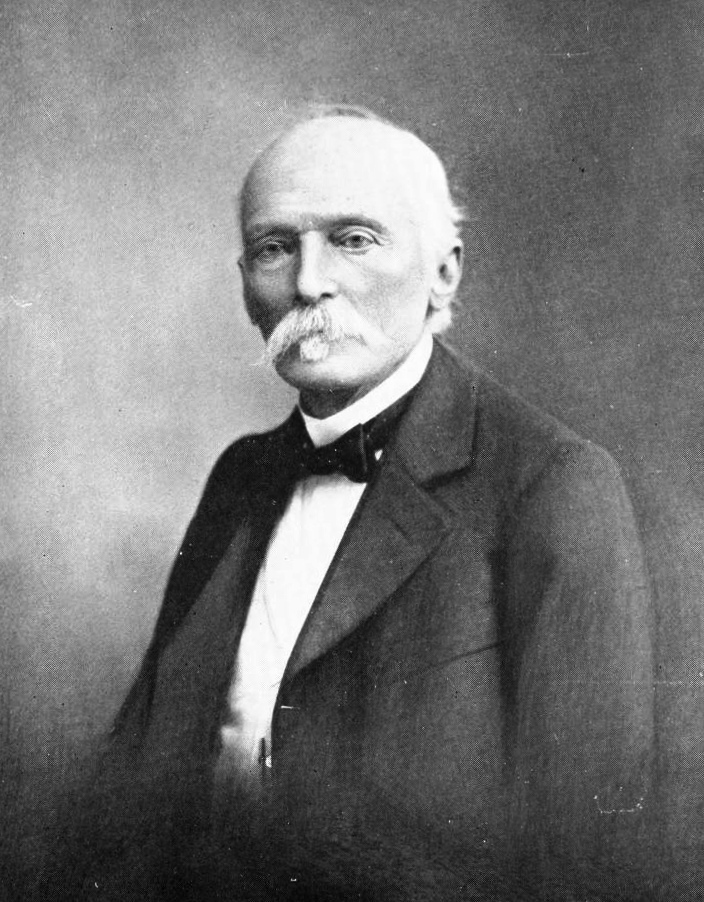
Claude-François Jeunet

Claude-François Jeunet (1844, Recologne – 19--), was a French entomologist who specialized in Lepidoptera. He studied the fauna of Doubs and Franche-Comté and was a friend of Charles Oberthur.
