= Wayne Harley Brachman =

American chef

- Born: 1947 (age 78–79)
- Culinary career
- Cooking style: Retro deserts, Southwestern deserts, Ashkenazi cuisine, Eastern European cuisine, Jewish cuisine
- Award
- Best 10 Pastry Chefs of 1998 by Chocolatier Magazine

Wayne Harley Brachman is an American pastry chef, cookbook author and television host. He is most known to audiences as one of the rotating co-hosts on the Food Network show Melting Pot, which aired in the early 2000s and featured two chefs per episode cooking foods unique to their cultural and ethnic backgrounds. Brachman's segments were co-hosted with Michael Symon. Brachman drew upon his Jewish heritage and Symon cooked family recipes from his Romanian grandfather during their segments which were classified as Eastern European according to the show's categories. Brachman also frequently appeared as a guest co-host on Sweet Dreams, a Food Network dessert show hosted by Gale Gand. He also worked as a spokesman for Hass Avocados from Mexico in the mid-to-late 2000s.

== Professional career ==
Before becoming a pastry chef, Brachman worked as a junior high orchestra teacher. Brachman was offered his first pastry job in a Massachusetts restaurant that had just lost its chef. A completely self-taught chef, Wayne has never taken any cooking classes nor apprenticed under another chef.

After learning his trade in Massachusetts, he landed a job in New York City as the pastry chef at The Odeon before going on to work at Arizona 206. Wayne then teamed up with Bobby Flay, becoming the executive pastry chef at Mesa Grill and Bolo during the 1990s.

His first daughter, Isabella, was born while he was working at Mesa Grill. His second daughter, Violet, was born 3 years later. During this period in the 1990s, Brachman published his first cookbook, Cakes and Cowpokes in 1995, which explores Southwestern desserts. During this time, Wayne began appearing in local media to promote his book.

In 1998, Chocolatier Magazine named him one of the "Best 10 Pastry Chefs". In 2000, Brachman published his second book, Retro Desserts, which takes a look back at classic American favorites.

In the late 1990s, while still working as the Executive Pastry Chef at Flay's Mesa Grill, Brachman joined Bobby Flay as one of Food Network's burgeoning line-up of Celebrity chefs and professionals during the height of the network's instructional-based format of the early 2000s before the network's later transition to more general travel and competition-based food content. Michael Symon, Brachman's co-host at Food Network, credits Brachman for introducing him to Bobby Flay, who later became Symon's mentor at Food Network.

Brachman published two more books in the early 2000s, American Desserts (2003) and See Dad Cook (2005). The latter book was dedicated to his daughters and featured some of their school-age lunchbox favorites as well as basic recipes aimed at making cooking more accessible to the growing number of men cooking for their families. Following his departure from Food Network's primary line-up and a stint at FireBird restaurant, Brachman began working freelance in the New York City area.

Since the mid-2000s, Brachman has appeared in food commercials as a spokesman for food-related products and made appearances in local media, as well as continuing to make sporadic appearances as a guest judge and commentator on various Food Network competition and travel shows.

As of the 2020s, Brachman continues to work as a pastry chef at Porter House New York.

== Bibliography ==
- Cakes and Cowpokes (1995) ISBN 0-688-13091-7
- Retro Desserts (2000) ISBN 0-688-16444-7
- American Desserts (2003) ISBN 1-4000-4665-3
- See Dad Cook (2005) ISBN 1-4000-8187-4
