= Bonnay, Saône-et-Loire =

Bonnay
- Part of Bonnay-Saint-Ythaire
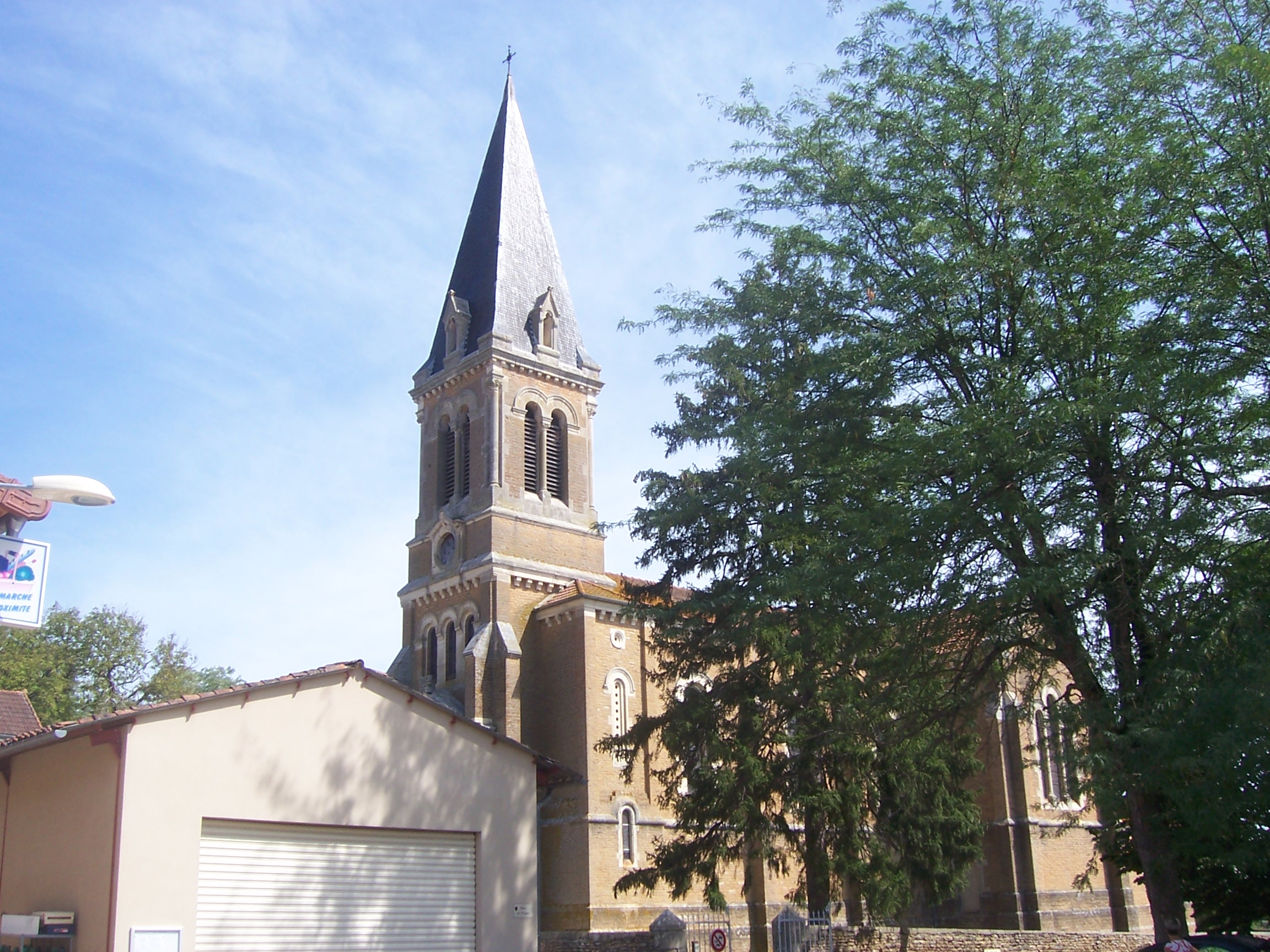
- The church in Bonnay

- Coat of arms
- Location of Bonnay
- Location within France Location within Bourgogne-Franche-Comté
- Coordinates: 46°33′03″N 4°37′21″E
- Country: France
- Region: Bourgogne-Franche-Comté
- Department: Saône-et-Loire
- Arrondissement: Mâcon
- Canton: Cluny
- Commune: Bonnay-Saint-Ythaire
- Area^{1}: 11.99 km^{2} (4.63 sq mi)
- Elevation: 350 m (1,150 ft)
- Highest elevation: 378 m (1,240 ft)
- Lowest elevation: 197 m (646 ft)
- Population (2022): 312
  - Density: 26.0/km^{2} (67.4/sq mi)
- Time zone: UTC+01:00 (CET)
  - Summer (DST): UTC+02:00 (CEST)
- Postal code: 71460
- ^{1} French Land Register data, which excludes lakes, ponds, glaciers > 1 km^{2} (0.386 sq mi or 247 acres) and river estuaries.

Bonnay is a former commune in the Saône-et-Loire department in the region of Bourgogne-Franche-Comté in eastern France. On 1 January 2023, it was merged into the new commune of Bonnay-Saint-Ythaire.

== See also ==
- Communes of the Saône-et-Loire department
