= Bonnay, Doubs =

Bonnay
- Commune
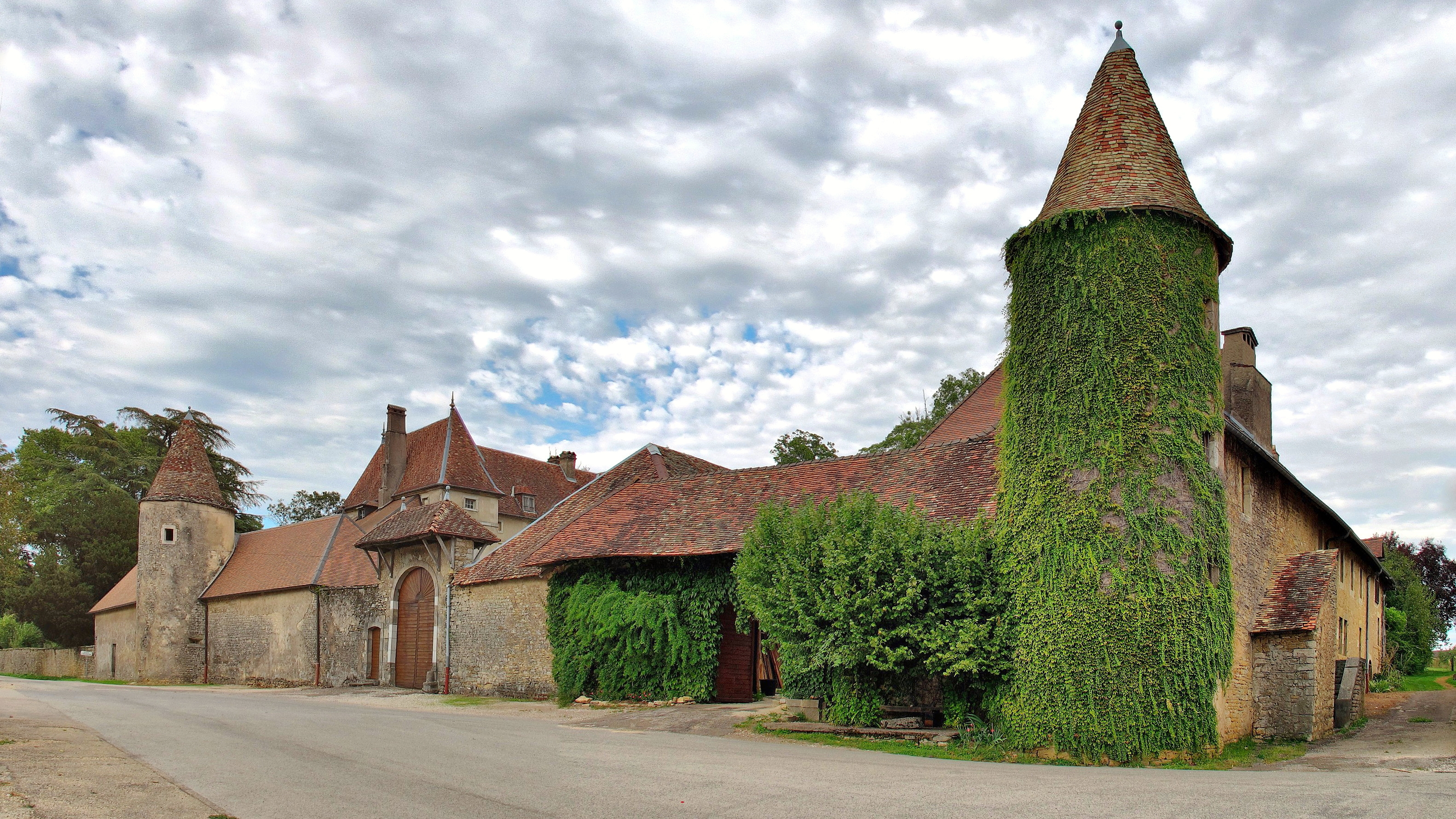
- Chateau
- Location of Bonnay
- Location within France Location within Bourgogne-Franche-Comté
- Coordinates: 47°20′05″N 6°03′04″E
- Country: France
- Region: Bourgogne-Franche-Comté
- Department: Doubs
- Arrondissement: Besançon
- Canton: Baume-les-Dames
- Intercommunality: Grand Besançon Métropole

Government
  - Mayor (2020–2026): Gilles Ory
- Area^{1}: 7.66 km^{2} (2.96 sq mi)
- Highest elevation: 600 m (2,000 ft)
- Lowest elevation: 216 m (709 ft)
- Population (2023): 826
  - Density: 108/km^{2} (279/sq mi)
- Time zone: UTC+01:00 (CET)
  - Summer (DST): UTC+02:00 (CEST)
- INSEE/Postal code: 25073 /25870
- ^{1} French Land Register data, which excludes lakes, ponds, glaciers > 1 km^{2} (0.386 sq mi or 247 acres) and river estuaries.

Bonnay (French pronunciation: [bɔnɛ]) is a commune in the Doubs department in the Bourgogne-Franche-Comté region in eastern France.

== Population ==
Historical population
Year	Pop.	±% p.a.
1968	253	—
1975	377	+5.86%
1982	452	+2.63%
1990	576	+3.08%
1999	676	+1.79%
2007	723	+0.84%
2012	855	+3.41%
2017	837	−0.42%
2023	826	−0.22%
Source: INSEE

== Personalities ==
- Roland Mesnier, former White House pastry chief

== See also ==
- Communes of the Doubs department
