= Jean-Paul Jeunet =

French chef

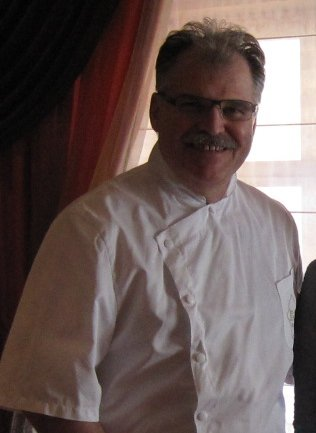
- Born: 2 December 1954 (age 71); Arbois, Jura, France
- Culinary career
- Rating: Michelin stars
- Current restaurant: Jean-Paul Jeunet
- Website: www.jeanpauljeunet.com

Jean-Paul Jeunet (born 2 December 1954) is a retired French Michelin-starred chef.

== Biography and career ==
Jean-Paul Jeunet was born in Arbois in the department of Jura in a family of hotel owners and restaurateurs.

He was trained at the hotel school of Nice before joining the Réserve de Beaulieu with the Troisgros brothers in Roanne under the leadership of Jean Troisgros, at the Hôtel Ritz Paris and at La Marée.

He followed his training course in pastry with the president of the pastry chefs Jean Millet, at Gaston Lenôtre, and finally at the Relais de la Poste in Magescq.

He later came back at the family restaurant to work with his father, and then succeeded him in 1988. He obtained two stars at the Guide Michelin, and also owns a cave of Jura wine with over 60 references of vin jaune supervised by the sommelier Stéphane Planche.

Jenuet retired in 2016 whereupon his restaurant was renamed La Maison Jeunet.

== Restaurant ==
- La Maison Jeunet : 9 rue de l'Hôtel de Ville 39600 Arbois

== See also ==
- List of Michelin starred restaurants
- List of chefs - Gastronomy
