= Roland Mesnier =

French-born American pastry chef and culinary writer (1944–2022)

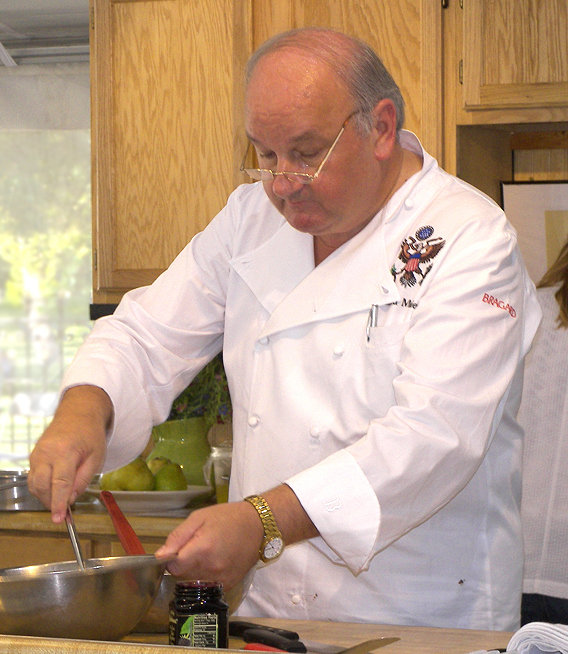
- Mesnier does a cooking demonstration at the 2007 Texas Book Festival
- Born: July 8, 1944; Bonnay, France
- Died: August 26, 2022 (aged 78); Burke, Virginia, U.S.
- Education: Apprenticeship
- Spouse: Martha
- Culinary career
- Cooking style: Pastries and cakes
- Current restaurant: Retired
- Website: Official website

Roland Mesnier (July 8, 1944 – August 26, 2022) was a French-born American pastry chef and culinary writer. His creations during his twenty-five years as executive pastry chef (1980–2004) at the White House earned him the reputation of a creative genius.

== Career ==
Mesnier was born into a family of nine children in the village of Bonnay, France. He first became interested in becoming a chef when he visited his brother's pastry shop in a nearby city. When he was fourteen, his mother secured an apprenticeship for him at a pastry shop in Besançon. He worked from 6am to 8pm six days a week, and in exchange received 300 francs a month, plus room and board, in addition to cooking lessons.

Like most young apprentices, Mesnier was at first given only menial tasks, such as grocery shopping, to see whether he was truly interested in learning the profession. Mesnier stayed on and eventually was taught how to make cakes, croissants, and brioche. He also was first exposed to puff pastry and chocolate molding, which laid the groundwork for his future specialties. At 17 he passed his apprenticeship exam and began to look for work that would enhance both his skills and his reputation.

Eventually he found his way to Paris, working in a restaurant and pastry shop near the Opéra Garnier. He soon mastered all there was to learn in Paris, and on the advice of his employer he went to West Germany, where techniques were more advanced. Mesnier lived in Hamburg and Hanover and learned marzipan modeling along with how to make cakes, cookies, and fondants, as well as the German and English languages.

Mesnier was hired as White House pastry chef in 1979 by First Lady Rosalynn Carter, and retired on July 30, 2004.

In 2011, Mesnier endorsed a number of products for Panpan Food (Chinese: 盼盼食品) in Fujian Province, China, and recorded several commercials that were broadcast during the advertising time of mainland Chinese TV stations.

== Personal life and death ==
In 1967, while he was working in Bermuda, Mesnier met his wife, Martha Whiteford, a teacher from West Virginia. Together they had a son.

After retiring, Mesnier wrote a book about his White House experiences, titled All the President's Pastries (2007).

A short time before his death, Mesnier entered an assisted-living facility in Burke, Virginia, where he died of cancer on August 26, 2022, at the age of 78.

== Bibliography ==
- Dessert University: More Than 300 Spectacular Recipes and Essential Lessons from White House Pastry Chef Roland Mesnier, published August 10, 2004, ISBN 978-0-7432-2317-1
- Sucré d'Etat: Mémoires du pâtissier français de la Maison-Blanche, published February 14, 2006, ISBN 978-2-08-068789-0
- All the Presidents' Pastries: Twenty-Five Years in the White House, A Memoir, published February 13, 2007, ISBN 978-2-08-030559-6 [Note: This is an English translation of Sucré d'Etat]
- Roland Mesnier's Basic to Beautiful Cakes, published October 16, 2007, ISBN 0-7432-8789-4

== See also ==
- List of pastry chefs
