= Alain Roby =

American pastry chef

Alain Roby is an American pastry chef. He is the holder of three Guinness World Records. He is also the owner All Chocolate Kitchen, a chocolate and pastry shop located in Geneva, Illinois.

== Biography ==
Roby learned his culinary expertise in Paris, working with Pastry Chef Lenotre. Chef Alain Roby is a Certified Master Chef of Pastry and Sugar Artistry and is internationally known for his life-size chocolate and sugar sculptures. Chef Roby worked as the Corporate Executive Pastry Chef for Hyatt Regency Chicago for 24 years, before opening All Chocolate Kitchen on July 30, 2011.

== Achievements ==
- He is a permanent committee member of the Societe D’Escofier Chicago
- He served as Private Pastry Chef to Shah of Iran, while also working in various cities like London, New York, Tokyo, and Chicago.
- He is a Hall of Fame member in both “Pastry Art & Design” and “Chocolatier” magazines
- His life-sized chocolate and sugar sculptures have been featured on the Food Network and The Learning Channel and one for the "World's Longest Candy Cane."
- He is the only Pastry Chef to have won three Guinness World Records: one for the “World's Tallest Cooked Sugar Building”, one for the “World's Tallest Chocolate Sculpture,” and one for the "World's Longest Candy Cane."
- He served as a celebrity chef during the Celebrity Chef Tour in Chicago and has been the head pastry chef at the NFL Commissioner's Super Bowl Party for the past 19 years.
- He has won over twenty culinary awards throughout his career
- Served as the Senior Corporate Pastry Chef for Hyatt Hotels, being in charge of the Pastry Division for all Hyatt Hotels and Resorts.
