= Pâtisserie =

Type of bakery specializing in sweet baked goods and desserts, and the good themselves

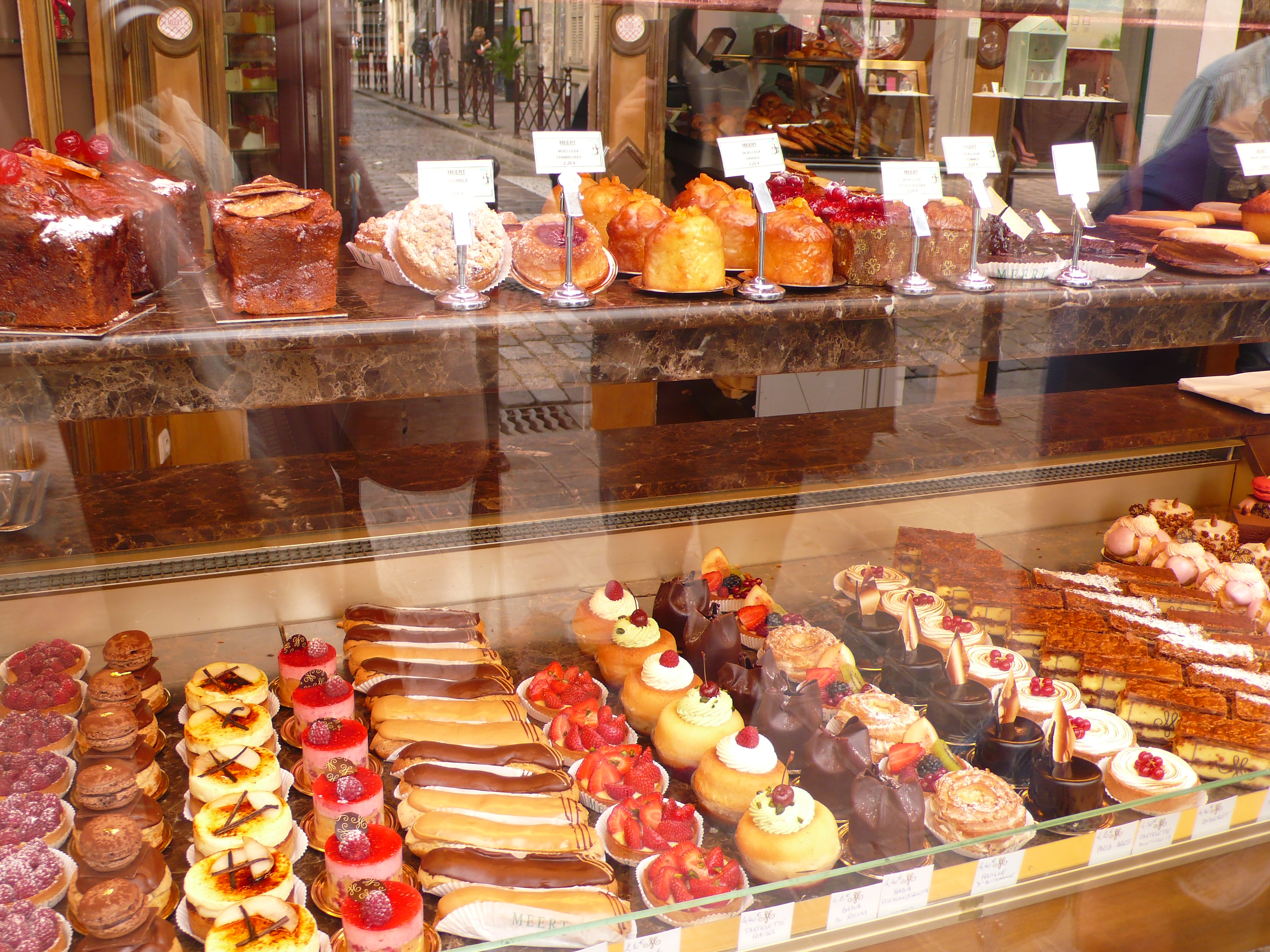
A Pâtisserie in Lille, France

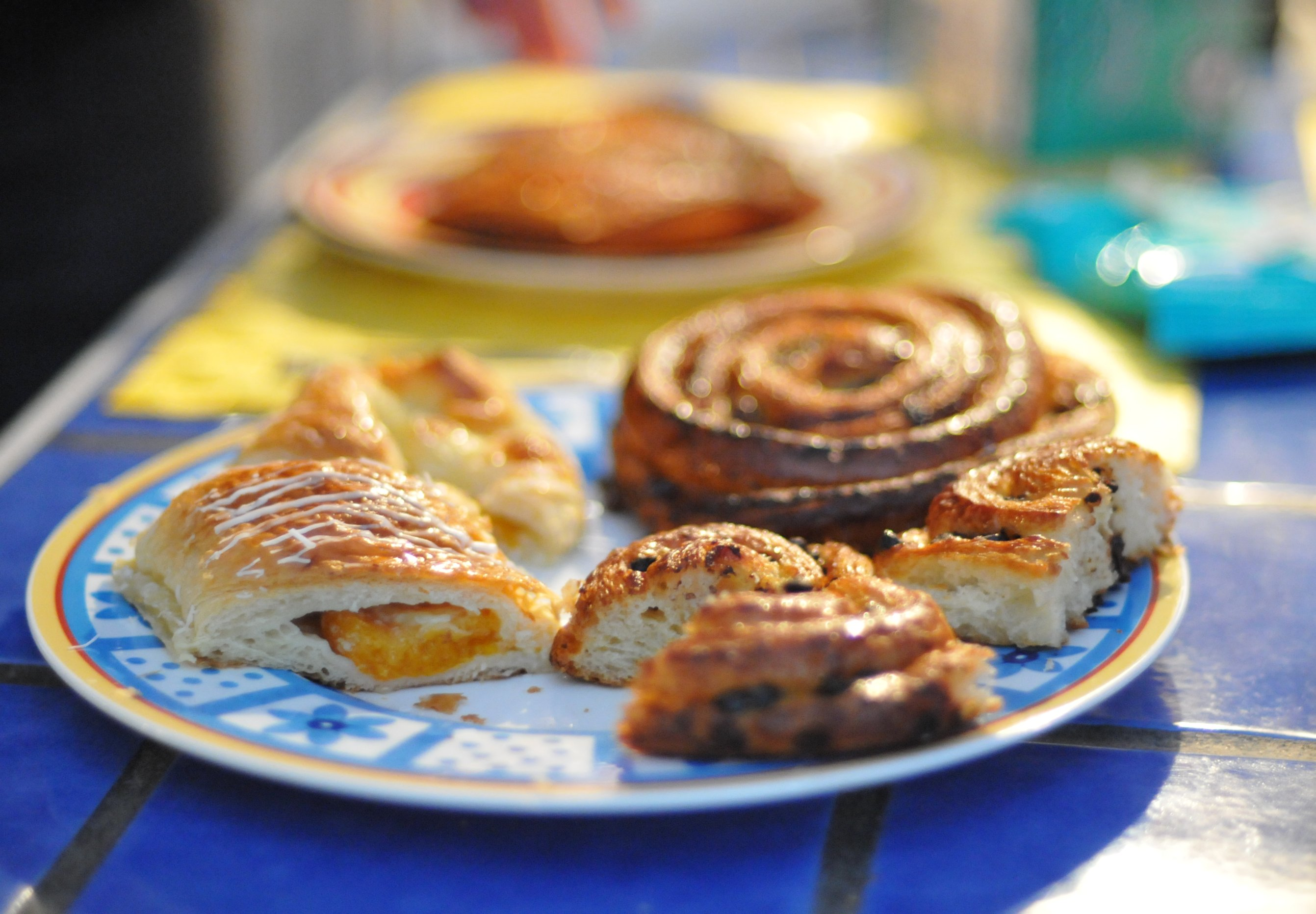
Pastries from a bakery in Montreal, Quebec

A pâtisserie (French: [pɑtisʁi]; pasticceria in Italian; pastry shop or patisserie in English) is a type of bakery that specializes in baker's confectionery and desserts. In French, the word pâtisserie also denotes the goods that they make as well as the production of them.

While the making and selling of sweet baked goods and desserts may often be only one part of the activity of a bakery, (Note: French: boulangerie; Dutch: bakkerij; German: Bäckerei) in some countries pâtisserie or its equivalents are legally controlled titles which may only be used by bakeries that employ a licensed "master pastry chef" (French: maître pâtissier; Dutch: meester banketbakker; German: Konditormeister). For example, in France and Belgium, the maître pâtissier is a pastry chef who has completed a lengthy training process, typically an apprenticeship, and passed a written examination.

== In other countries ==
=== Europe ===
In Britain, morning goods are pastries, scones, and other products which are baked and sold fresh each day.

In Croatia, the term slastičarnica is used to denote a patisserie that makes cakes and sweet pastries. The word pekarnica is used for a bakery that bakes savory products such as bread as well as savory and sweet rolls.

In France and Canada, the term pâtisserie also refers to the pastries produced by a pâtissier. Mass-produced pastries are also sometimes called pâtisserie.

In Holland, banketbakkerij. The word banketgebak is used for the confections sold in such an establishment.

In Hungary, the term cukrászda is used to refer to a pâtisserie.

In Italy, pasticceria (Italian pronunciation: [pastittʃeˈriːa]).

In Poland, there are two terms commonly used to refer to shops making and selling sweet baked goods: cukiernia (from cukier 'sugar') and ciastkarnia (from ciastko 'pastry', diminutive form of ciasto 'cake', 'dough').

In Portugal, they are known as pastelaria. Other terms used are patisseria, confeitaria, doçaria, and doceria.

In Spain, pastelería. Synonyms: dulcería, panadería, tortería, and repostería.

In Sweden, formerly called sockerbageri

=== Elsewhere ===
In Lebanon, pâtisserie is used commonly along with the word bakery.

In Australia, there is no specific legal or licensing requirement for a business to call itself a "patisserie". The term is generally used to describe a bakery or shop specializing in pastries and desserts, often with a focus on French-style products. However, professional standards and industry expectations do exist.

In Bangladeshi languages the term in common usage is called pâtis in its shortened form.

In Brazil the Portuguese term is "confeitaria".

In Korean and Japanese, the term pâtisserie is used as well (Japanese: パティスリー, romanized: patisurī, Korean: 파티스리, romanized: patiseuri).

==== North Africa ====
In Algeria, Morocco, and Tunisia, the term pâtisserie is used in formal culinary contexts to encompass all varieties of sweets. However, in everyday spoken language, it specifically denotes French-style cream pastries (such as mille-feuille or éclairs), to distinguish them from traditional sweets (gâteaux traditionnels) and pan-cooked doughs like baghrir.

== See also ==
- Category: Food industry-related lists
- Confectionery store
- Global cuisine
- Konditorei
- List of bakeries
- Doughnut shop
- List of pastries
- List of pastry chefs
- Pie shop
- Yumeiro Patissiere
