= Yves Thuriès =

French chef

- Born: 5 June 1938 (age 87); Lempaut, Tarn, France
- Culinary career
- Cooking style: Pastry; Chocolate
- Current restaurants: Le Grand Écuyer; Hostellerie du Vieux Cordes
- Website: www.thuries.fr www.yvesthuries.com

Yves Thuriès (born June 5, 1938) is a French cooking and pastry chef, twice Meilleur Ouvrier de France.

== Life and career ==
=== Early life and training ===
Yves Thuriès was born in the village of Lempaut in the department of Tarn. He began at age fourteen his training in pastry. At age 17, he prepared a CAP (Certificat d'Aptitude Professionnelle) in Toulouse and traveled as a wandering journeyman.

In 1958, he went to Algeria as a conscript. In Hussein Dey near Algiers, he became a chief of section. In Béchar, he was put in charge of the Officers Mess.

In 1968, Monsieur Jantou from Toulouse was the last employer of Yves Thuriès. He owned a pastry shop in Gaillac that he decided to sell to his trained worker, that would give him the opportunity to establish himself definitely. It was a period of contests and prices. It was also the beginning of the writing of his encyclopedia Le livre de recettes d'un Compagnon du Tour de France. Ten years later, ten colleagues work for him.

=== Meilleur Ouvrier de France and international success ===
In 1976, Yves Thuriès was named twice Meilleur Ouvrier de France. His case is unique because he received this honour on one hand for ice cream, sorbets, ice cream desserts, and on the other hand for pastry, confectionery and catering.

In 1977, he published the first volume of La pâtisserie française. His encyclopedia is translated into several languages and became around the world, a reference for over 200,000 professionals. The twelfth edition was released in 2007.

In 1979, he received the Culinary Trophy and was named Chef of the year. He expands his knowledge all around the world. He founded pastry shops especially in the United States where he created the teams in Los Angeles, Dallas and San Francisco. He has also held demonstrations in Germany, Spain, Switzerland, Belgium, Italy, Japan, Thailand and China.

=== Later career and publications ===
In 1980, he acquired the hotel-restaurant Le Grand Écuyer at Cordes-sur-Ciel. In a few years, he made of it the highest rated hotel of the region. In 1985, he bought the Hostellerie du Vieux Cordes and made of it a bistro.

In 1988, he released the first edition of his magazine dedicated to cooking and pastry Thuriès Magazine. In 1989, he created the Musée des Arts du Sucre et du Chocolat. His chef is Jean-François Arnaud. He also received at that time the Prix Édouard de Pomiane.

In 1991, he created his own brand of chocolates. He also received the Prix du Tourisme Midi-Pyrénées given by the Musée des Arts du Sucre and the Prix Trimbetta (Meilleur Livre sur les Métiers de Bouche).

== Shops in France and worldwide ==
Yves Thuriès owns several chocolate shops especially in the South of France. He also owns shops in Japan, Canada, United Kingdom and Morocco.

== Honours ==
- Meilleur Ouvrier de France in 1976
- Chevalier of the Ordre National du Mérite
- President of the Meilleurs Ouvriers de France of the Grand Sud-Ouest in 1995
