= Gaston Lenôtre =

French pastry chef

Gaston Lenôtre (French pronunciation: [ɡastɔ̃ lənotʁ], 28 May 1920 – 8 January 2009) was a French pastry chef. He is known as a possible creator of the opera cake (gâteau opéra), the founder of Lenôtre, a culinary empire, whose brand includes restaurants, catering services, retail concerns and cooking schools, as well as one of the three founders with Paul Bocuse and Roger Vergé of Les Chefs de France at Epcot in Orlando, Florida, US.

Lenôtre compared the making of pastry to architecture, where structure, materials and precision are key for making great pastries.

== Biography ==
Lenôtre was born on a small farm in Normandy, in the commune of Saint-Nicolas-du-Bosc. Both of his parents eventually moved the family to Paris and became restaurant workers. Lenôtre's mother worked as a pastry and general cook for a French baron and his father was a chef at the Grand Hôtel in Paris. Eventually, his father's ill health forced them to move back to Normandy where he struggled to find a chef position. Prior to the outbreak of World War II, Gaston Lenôtre would bicycle to Paris to sell homemade chocolates.

Following the war, Lenôtre opened a small bakery in Normandy. The venture was a success and in 1957 he came upon the opportunity to purchase a tiny bakery in the 16th Arrondissement of Paris. His new establishment did extremely well from the outset and is said to have presaged nouvelle cuisine. Lenôtre was renowned for concentrating on simple preparations and fresh ingredients, and for insisting on using the best butter in his pastries.

The year 1964 saw Lenôtre enter the catering field. Due in large part to improvements in freezing food perishables, he was able to quickly expand the number of diners he was able to serve.

The year 1971 saw Lenôtre open his first cooking school in Plaisir, Yvelines France. Among the chefs who studied under Lenôtre there was David Bouley and Jean-Paul Jeunet. The chef Pierre Hermé was an apprentice of his, as was the pastry chef Sébastien Canonne. The chef Alain Ducasse also worked under him.

In 1974 Lenôtre dispatched another then apprentice of his Michel Richard to open Chateau France a restaurant and patisserie on the East Side of Manhattan in New York City to spotlight the Lenôtre culinary style. It only stayed in business for a single year.

Quickly bouncing back from this failed venture, in 1982 he opened Les Chefs de France in the France Pavilion in Walt Disney World's Epcot Center together with Paul Bocuse and Roger Vergé.

In 1985 the businesses under the banner head Lenôtre were taken over by the French hotel firm Accor.

== Death ==
Gaston Lenôtre died on 8 January 2009 at the age of 88 in Sennely, Loiret. He was buried in the family vault at Bernay, Eure.

== Published work ==
- Lenotre's Desserts and Pastries, Barron's, 1978
