= Pierre Hermé =

French pastry chef and chocolatier (born 1961)

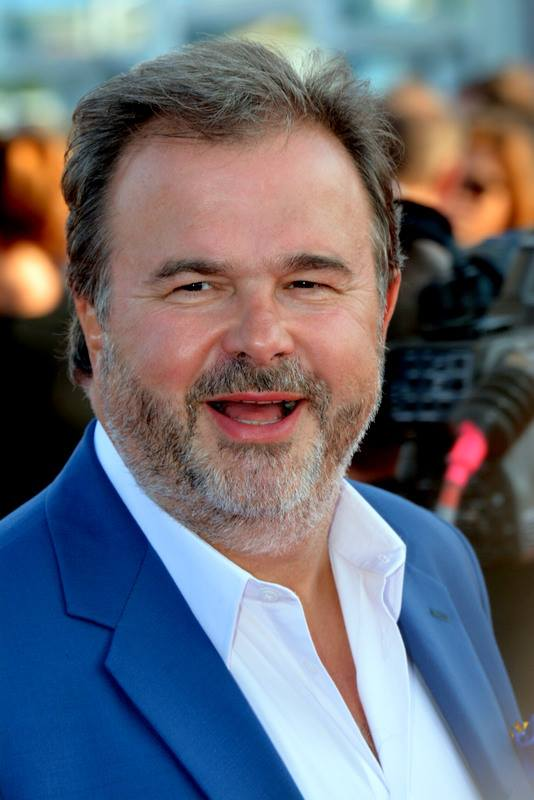
- Hermé in 2017
- Born: 20 November 1961 (age 64); Colmar, France
- Culinary career
- Cooking style: French
- Website: www.pierreherme.com

Pierre Hermé (French pronunciation: [pjɛʁ ɛʁme]; born 20 November 1961) is a French pastry chef and chocolatier. He began his career at the age of 14 as an apprentice to Gaston Lenôtre. Called "the Picasso of Pastry" by Vogue, Hermé was awarded the title of World's Best Pastry Chef in 2016 by The World's 50 Best Restaurants. He was also ranked the fourth most influential French person in the world by Vanity Fair. In 1998, Hermé created his own brand with Charles Znaty. He has written or co-written over 40 books.

== Life and career ==
Heir to four generations of Alsatian bakery and pastry-making tradition, Pierre Hermé arrived in Paris at the age of 14 to start his first apprenticeship with Gaston Lenôtre.

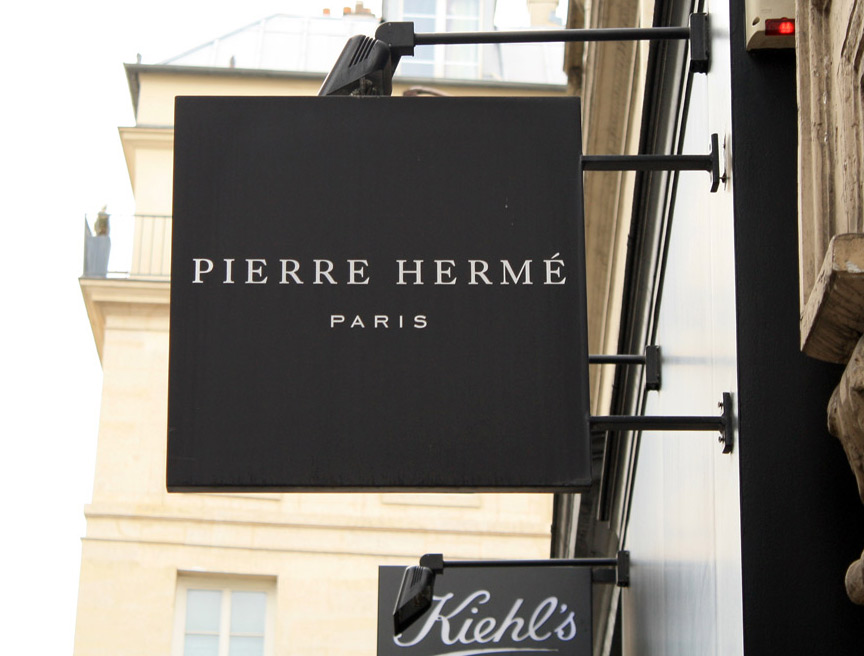
Pierre Hermé shop sign in Paris, Rue Bonaparte

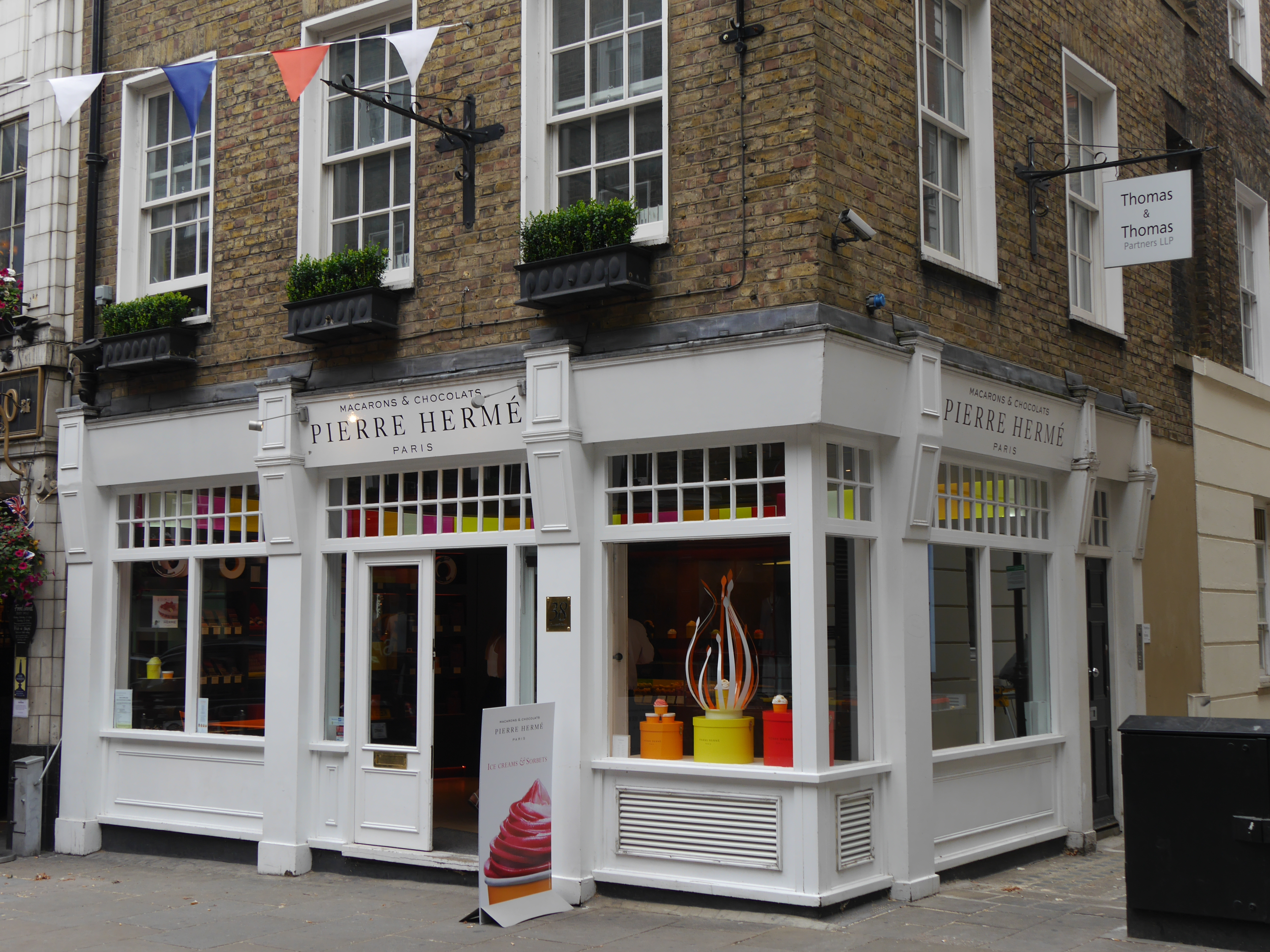
Pierre Hermé shop, Monmouth Street, Covent Garden, London

He created the Maison Pierre Hermé Paris in 1998 with his associate Charles Znaty. The first Pierre Hermé Paris boutique opened in Tokyo in 1998, followed in 2001 by a boutique in Paris, located in the Saint-Germain-des-Prés fashion district at 72 Rue Bonaparte. Success was immediate in Tokyo and Paris alike. Every day, enthusiastic gourmets discovered Hermé pastries, macarons and chocolates. In late 2004, a second Parisian boutique with its very innovative interior design opened at 185 Rue de Vaugirard. In early 2005, Tokyo saw the inauguration of the latest Pierre Hermé Paris concepts: the Luxury Convenience Store and the Chocolate Bar. Both establishments are situated in the Omotesando district, where all of the major imported brands and fashion houses active in Japan are also present. In 2008, Hermé and Znaty launched the first Macarons & Chocolats Pierre Hermé Paris boutique on Rue Cambon in Paris. In 2010, they inaugurated the Maison Pierre Hermé on Rue Fortuny in Paris, home to the Atelier de Création. The brand is a member of the Comité Colbert and has an established partnership with the Raffles group and Ritz Carlton group and Dior since the opening of the Café Dior by Pierre Hermé in 2015 in Seoul.

The company has been expanding strongly since 2010 on the international scene with several boutiques located in Europe, Asia and the Middle East. Since 2012, his desserts have been served on All Nippon Airways. In 2017, Hermé entered a partnership with La Mamounia, Marrakesh, to cater products on site.

== Creative style and praise ==
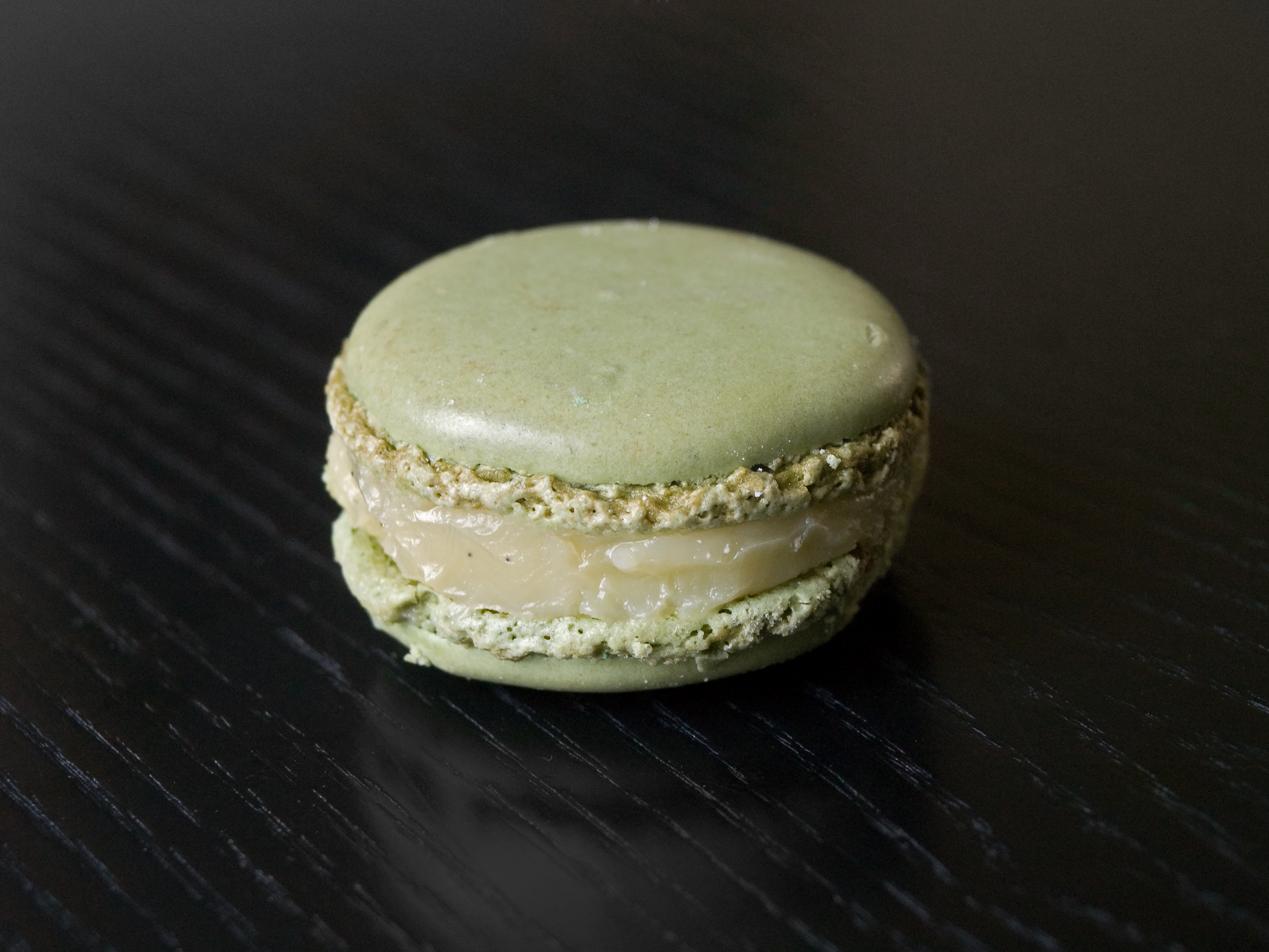
A Pierre Hermé's "Olive Oil and Vanilla" macaron

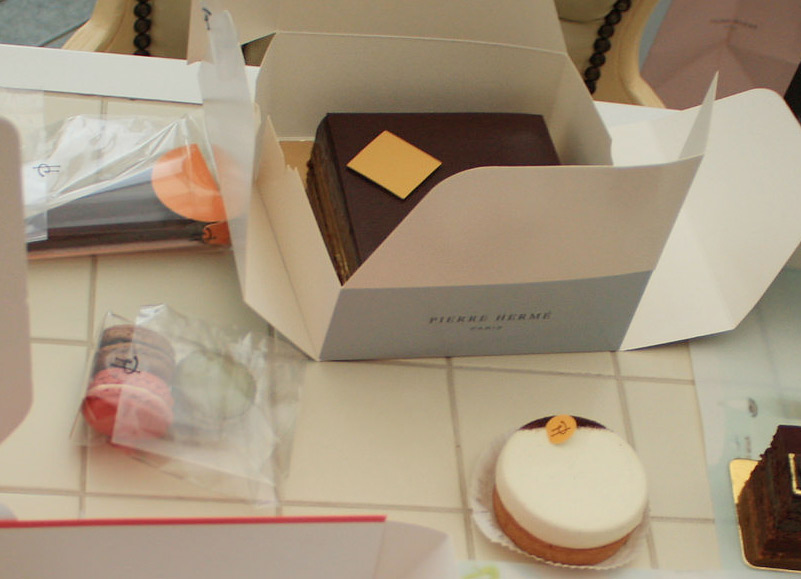
Pierre Hermé pastries, including macarons, tarte vanille, and chocolate cake

Pierre Hermé utilises discreet pastry decors and explores new taste territories in his products. Praise has often been lavished on Pierre Hermé, who has been called "pastry provocateur" (Food & Wine), "an avant-garde pastry chef and a magician with tastes" (Paris Match), and "The Kitchen Emperor" (New York Times).

Hermé was the youngest person to be named France's Pastry Chef of the Year, and is the only pastry chef to have been decorated as a Chevalier of Arts and Letters. He was awarded Chevalier de la Légion d'honneur by Jacques Chirac in May 2007.

In October 2023, an online class where Hermé teaches Iconic Pastries launched on PastryClass.

== Books ==
- Pierre Hermé, Secrets Gourmands, Larousse, 1993
- La Pâtisserie de Pierre Hermé, Montagud Editores, Spain, 1994
- Co-writer Larousse Gastronomique, 1996
- Le Larousse des Desserts de Pierre Hermé, Larousse, 1997
- Plaisirs Sucrés, Hachette, 1997
- Desserts by Pierre Hermé, Little Brown, US, 1998
- Pierre Hermé, Secrets Gourmands, Shibata Shoten, Japan, 1999
- Desserts à la carte, Hachette, 2000
- Pierre Hermé, Secrets Gourmands, Noésis, 2000
- La Pâtisserie de Pierre Hermé, Edizioni Finedit, Italy, 2001
- Chocolate Desserts by Pierre Hermé, Little Brown, US, 2001
- Le Larousse des Desserts, Larousse, 2002
- Plaisirs Sucrés (re-edition), Hachette, October 2002
- Mes Desserts au Chocolat, Agnès Viénot Éditions, October 2002
- Mes Desserts Préférés, Agnès Viénot Éditions, October 2003
- Die Pâtisserie Von Pierre Hermé, Mathaes, Germany, 2004
- Le Larousse du Chocolat, Éditions Larousse, October 2005
- The Cooks Book, Dorling Kindersley, UK, October 2005
- PH10, Agnès Vienot Éditions, October 2005. Winner of the Gourmand World Cookbook Awards
- Gourmandises, Agnès Vienot Éditions, October 2006
- Co-writer Comme un chef, Éditions Larousse, October 2006
- Gourmandises, Agnès Viénot, Éditions, 2006
- Le Larousse des desserts, Larousse, 2006
- Confidences Sucrées, Agnès Viénot Éditions, 2007
- Macaron, Agnès Viénot Édition, 2008
- Le Larousse des Desserts, Dohosha Media Plan, 2008
- Le livre des Fours secs et moelleux de Pierre Hermé, Asahiya Shuppan, 2009
- Carrément Chocolat, Agnès Viénot Édition, 2009
- Infiniment, Agnès Viénot Édition, 2010
- Le Livre Chocolat de Pierre Hermé, Asahiya Shuppan, 2010
- Rêves de pâtissier : 50 classiques de la pâtisserie réinventés, Éditions de la Martinière, October 2011
- Best of Pierre Hermé, Alain Ducasse Édition, November 2011
- Macarons, Grub Street Publishing, UK, 2011
- Le Livre des Viennoiseries de Pierre Hermé, Asahiya Shuppan, 2011
- Au Cœur du Goût (co-writer with Jean-Michel Duriez), Agnès Viénot Éditions, 2012
- Le Chocolat Apprivoisé, PHP Editions, 2013
- Ispahan, Éditions de la Martinière, 2013
- Pierre Hermé et moi (illustrated by Soledad Bravi), Édition Marabout, April 2014
- Macaron, Éditions de la Martinière, October 2014
- Satine, Éditions Gründ, 2015
- Chocolat, Pierre Hermé & Sergio Coimbra, Flammarion, 2016
