= Extinction (disambiguation) =

Extinction, in biology and palaeontology, is the end of a species or other taxon.

Extinction may also refer to:

== Science ==
- Mass extinction, or extinction event, a widespread and rapid decrease in the amount of life on earth
- Human extinction (end of the human species)
- Language extinction, or language death
- Extinction (another word for attenuation), in physical sciences
  - Extinction coefficient (another term for mass attenuation coefficient), in physical sciences
  - Extinction (astronomy)
  - Extinction (optical mineralogy), when cross-polarized light dims, as viewed through a thin section of a mineral in a petrographic microscope
    - Bird's eye extinction, in optical mineralogy
    - Undulose extinction, a geological term
  - Ewald–Oseen extinction theorem in optics, when light changes media
- Extinction (psychology), when a conditioned response is reduced or lost
- Extinction (neurology), a neurological disorder that impairs the ability to perceive multiple stimuli of the same type simultaneously

== Film and television ==
- "Extinction" (Star Trek: Enterprise), television episode
- "Extinction" (Smallville episode), television episode
- Resident Evil: Extinction, a 2007 film starring Milla Jovovich
- Transformers: Age of Extinction, a 2014 Transformers film
- Extinction (2015 film), a 2015 film starring Matthew Fox
- Extinction (2018 film), a 2018 science fiction thriller film

== Literature ==
- Extinction (Forgotten Realms novel), a fantasy novel by Lisa Smedman
- Extinction (Bernhard novel), a 1986 novel by Thomas Bernhard
- Extinction, a science fiction novel by Ray Hammond

== Video games ==
- "Extinction", a game mode in the video game Call of Duty: Ghosts
- Aliens Versus Predator: Extinction, a 2003 video game for PlayStation 2 and Xbox
- Extinction (video game), a 2018 action game by Iron Galaxy

== Other uses ==
- Extinction (peerage), in the United Kingdom, happens when all possible heirs of a peer have died out
- "Extinction", a song by Stigmata from the album Hollow Dreams
- Extinction (album), a 1990 album by Nausea

== See also ==
- Extinction Rebellion, environmental campaign
- Extinct (disambiguation)
- Extinction Event (disambiguation)
