= Extinct (disambiguation) =

Extinction is the end of a species.

Extinct may also refer to:

== Science ==
- Extinct volcano, one that scientists consider unlikely to erupt again
- Extinct town, an abandoned village, town, or city
- Extinct comet, one that has expelled most of its volatile ice
- Extinct in the wild, conservation status

== Media ==
- Extinct (2001 TV series), a C4 UK series about extinct species
- Extinct (2006 TV series), an ITV UK series about endangered species
- Extinct (2017 TV series), an American post-apocalyptic science-fiction TV series
- Extinct (album), a 2015 album by Moonspell
- Extinct (film), an animated film by David Silverman

== Other ==
- Extinct hereditary titles

== See also ==
- Extinct language
- Extinction (disambiguation)
- Lists of extinct species
- Dormant (disambiguation)
- Extant (disambiguation)
