= Extinction Event =

An extinction event, in biology and paleontology, refers to a mass extinction.

Extinction Event may refer to:

- The Extinction Event, a Doctor Who audio play
- Extinction Event, a card in the collectible card game Plants vs. Zombies Heroes
- Extinction Event (2009 novel) a spinoff novel of Primeval by Dan Abnett, see Dan Abnett bibliography
- Extinction Event (2003 comic book) a limited series comic published by WildStorm (DC), written by Robert Weinberg (author)

== See also ==
- Extinction Level Event: The Final World Front, an album by Busta Rhymes
  - Extinction Level Event 2: The Wrath of God, the sequel album
- Extinction Level Event (Dark Angel album), 2025
- Extinction (disambiguation), including events named "Extinction"
- Extinct (disambiguation)
