= Biotite =

Subgroup of phyllosilicate minerals within the trioctahedral mica group

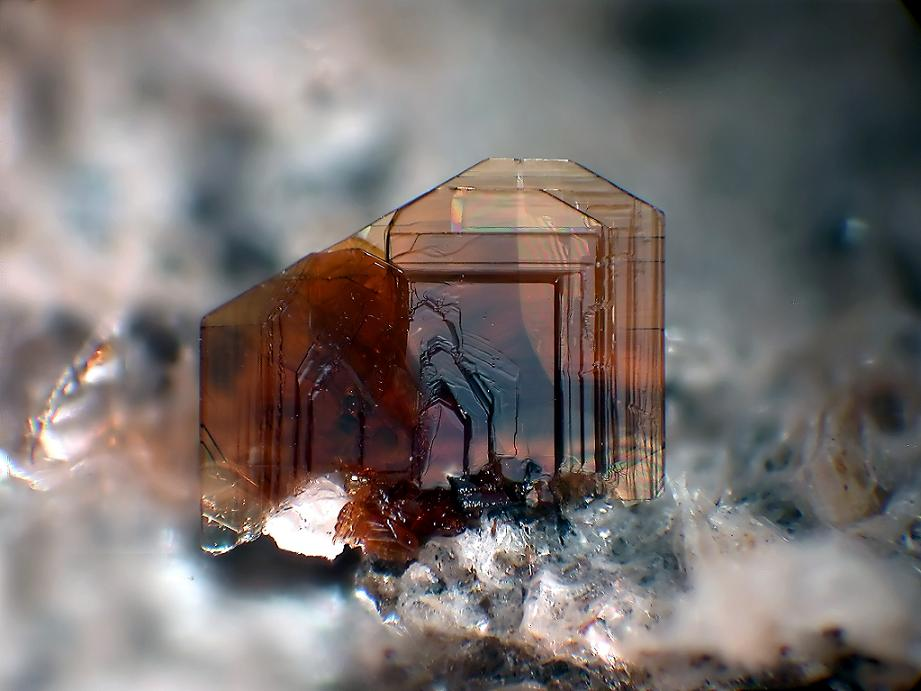
- Thin tabular biotite aggregate (Image width: 2.5 mm)

General
- Category: Phyllosilicate minerals
- Group: Mica group, trioctahedral mica group, biotite subgroup
- Formula: K(Mg,Fe)_{3}(AlSi_{3}O_{10})(OH,F)_{2}
- IMA symbol: Bt
- Crystal system: Monoclinic
- Crystal class: Prismatic (2/m) (same H-M symbol)
- Space group: C2/m

Identification
- Color: Dark brown, greenish-brown, blackish-brown, yellow
- Crystal habit: Massive to platy
- Twinning: Common on the [310], less common on the {001}
- Cleavage: Perfect on the {001}
- Fracture: Micaceous
- Tenacity: Brittle to flexible, elastic
- Mohs scale hardness: 2.5–3.0
- Luster: Vitreous to pearly
- Streak: White
- Diaphaneity: Transparent to translucent to opaque
- Specific gravity: 2.7–3.3
- Optical properties: Biaxial (−)
- Refractive index: n_{α} = 1.565–1.625 n_{β} = 1.605–1.675 n_{γ} = 1.605–1.675
- Birefringence: δ = 0.03–0.07
- Pleochroism: Strong
- Dispersion: r < v (Fe rich); r > v weak (Mg rich)
- Ultraviolet fluorescence: None

Major varieties
- Manganophyllite: K(Fe,Mg,Mn)_{3}AlSi_{3}O_{10}(OH)_{2}

Biotite is a common group of phyllosilicate minerals within the mica group, with the approximate chemical formula K(Mg,Fe)_{3}AlSi_{3}O_{10}(OH,F)_{2}. It is primarily a solid-solution series between the iron-endmember annite, and the magnesium-endmember phlogopite; more aluminous end-members include siderophyllite and eastonite. Biotite was regarded as a mineral species by the International Mineralogical Association until 1998, when its status was changed to a mineral group. The term biotite is still used to describe unanalysed dark micas in the field. Biotite was named by J.F.L. Hausmann in 1847 in honor of the French physicist Jean-Baptiste Biot, who performed early research into the many optical properties of mica.

Members of the biotite group are sheet silicates. Iron, magnesium, aluminium, silicon, oxygen, and hydrogen form sheets that are weakly bound together by potassium ions. The term "iron mica" is sometimes used for iron-rich biotite, but it also refers to a flaky, micaceous form of haematite, and the field term lepidomelane for unanalysed iron-rich biotite avoids this ambiguity. Biotite is also sometimes called "black mica" as opposed to "white mica" (muscovite) – both may form in the same rocks, and in some instances side by side.

== Properties ==
Like other mica minerals, biotite has a highly perfect basal cleavage, and consists of flexible sheets, or lamellae, which easily flake off. It has a monoclinic crystal system, with tabular to prismatic crystals with an obvious pinacoid termination. It has four prism faces and two pinacoid faces, forming a pseudohexagonal crystal. Although not easily seen because of the cleavage and sheets, fracture is uneven. It appears greenish to brown or black, and even yellow when weathered. It can be transparent to opaque, has a vitreous to pearly luster, and a grey-white streak. When biotite crystals are found in large chunks, they are called "books" because they resemble books with many pages. The color of biotite is usually black, and the mineral has a hardness of 2.5–3 on the Mohs scale of mineral hardness.

Biotite dissolves in both acid and alkaline aqueous solutions, with the highest dissolution rates at low pH. However, biotite dissolution is highly anisotropic with crystal edge surfaces (h k0) reacting 45 to 132 times faster than basal surfaces (001).

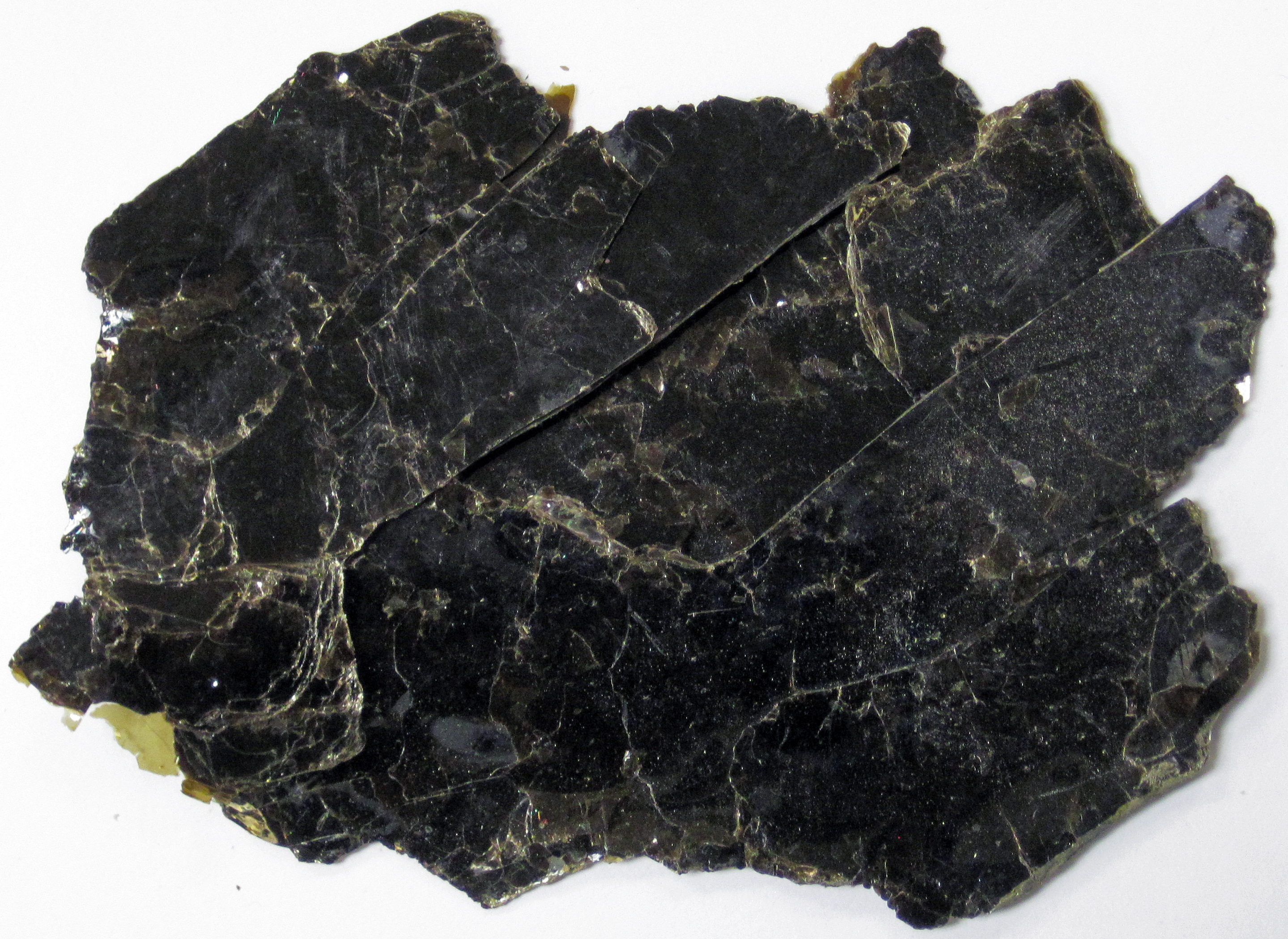
Flaky biotite sheets

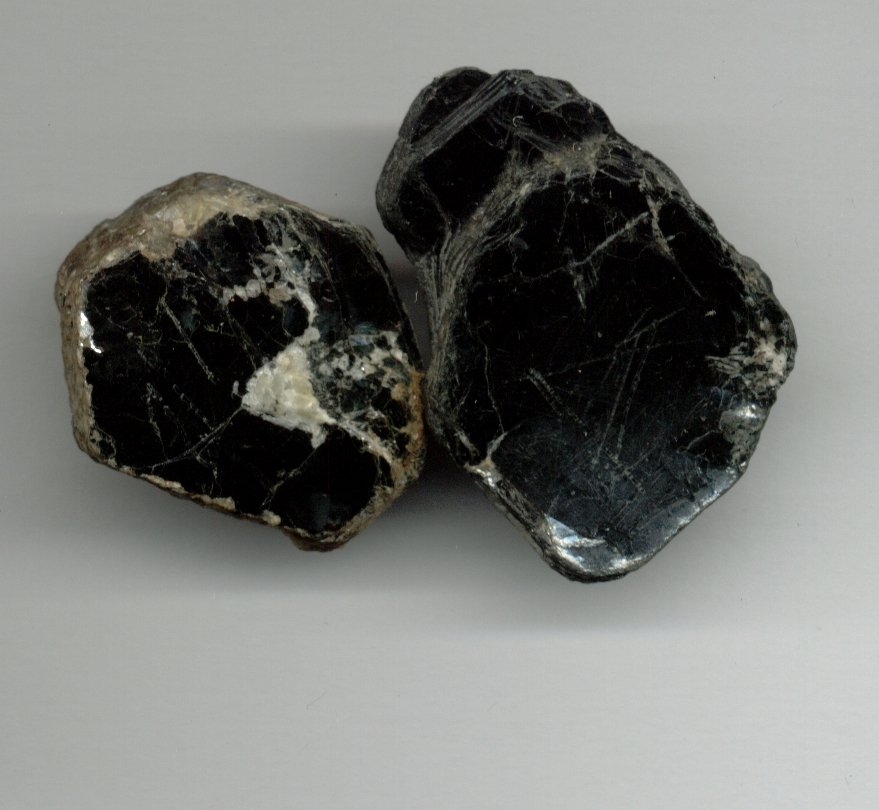
Thick biotite sample featuring many sheets

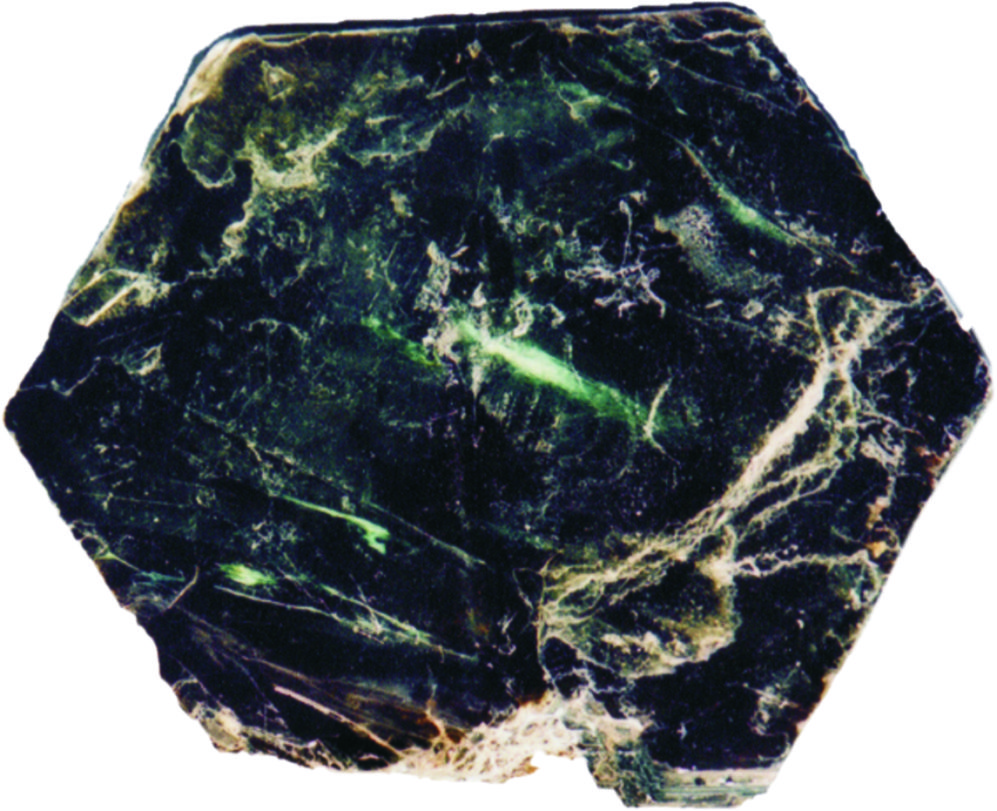
Biotite crystal exhibiting pseudohexagonal shape

=== Optical properties ===
In thin section, biotite exhibits moderate relief and a pale to deep greenish brown or brown color, with moderate to strong pleochroism. Biotite has a high birefringence which can be partially masked by its deep intrinsic color. Under cross-polarized light, biotite exhibits extinction approximately parallel to cleavage lines, and can have characteristic bird's eye maple extinction, a mottled appearance caused by the distortion of the mineral's flexible lamellae during grinding of the thin section. Basal sections of biotite in thin section are typically approximately hexagonal in shape and usually appear isotropic under cross-polarized light.

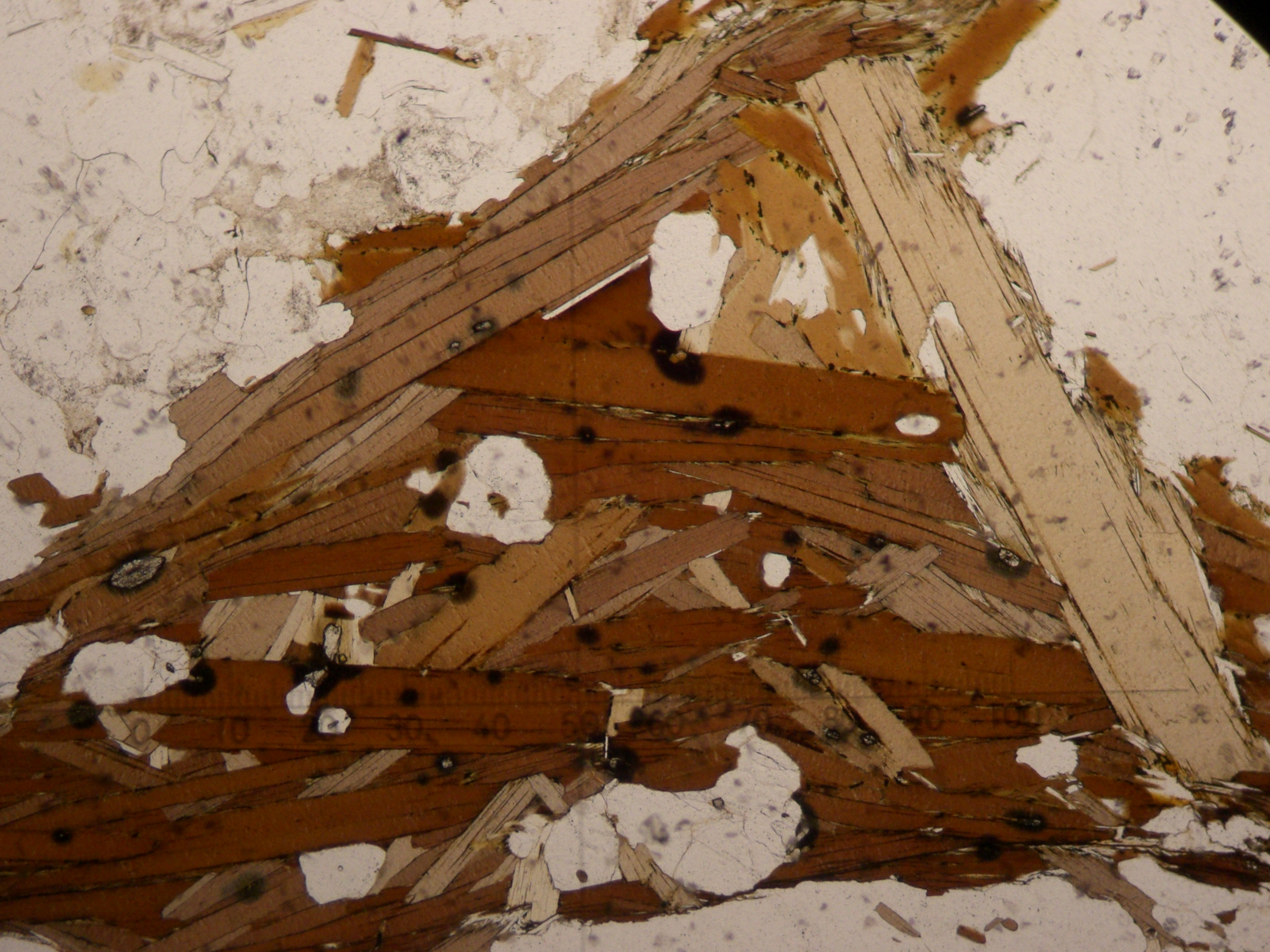
Biotite (in brown) and muscovite in an orthogneiss thin section under plane-polarized light

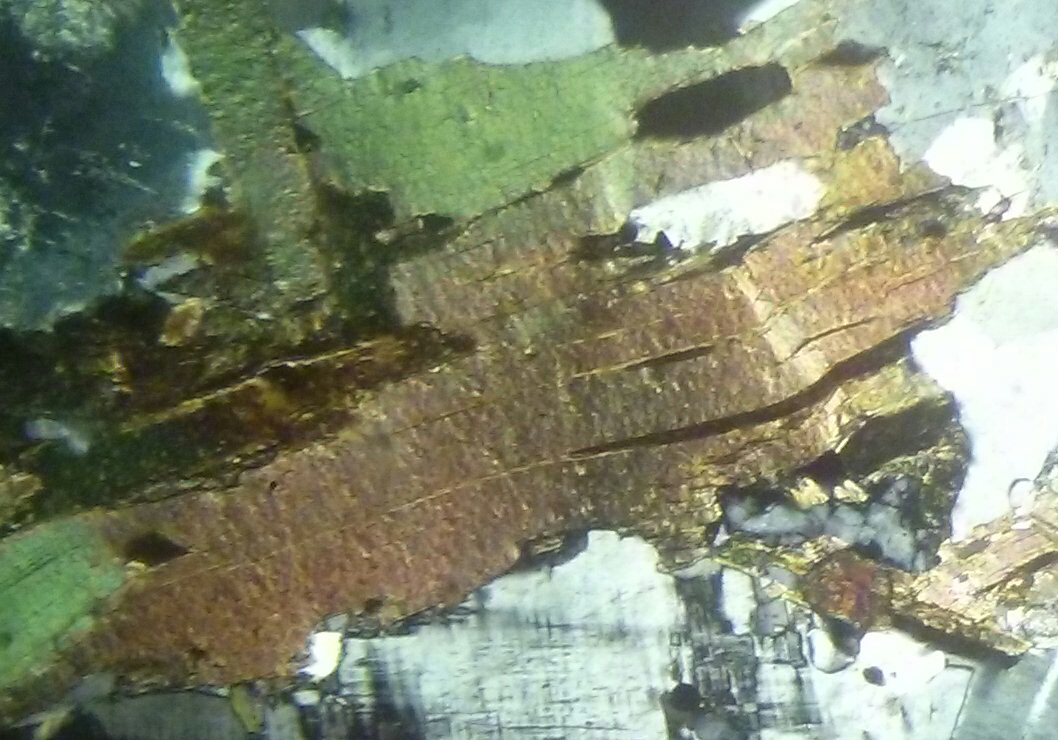
Biotite in thin section under cross-polarized light

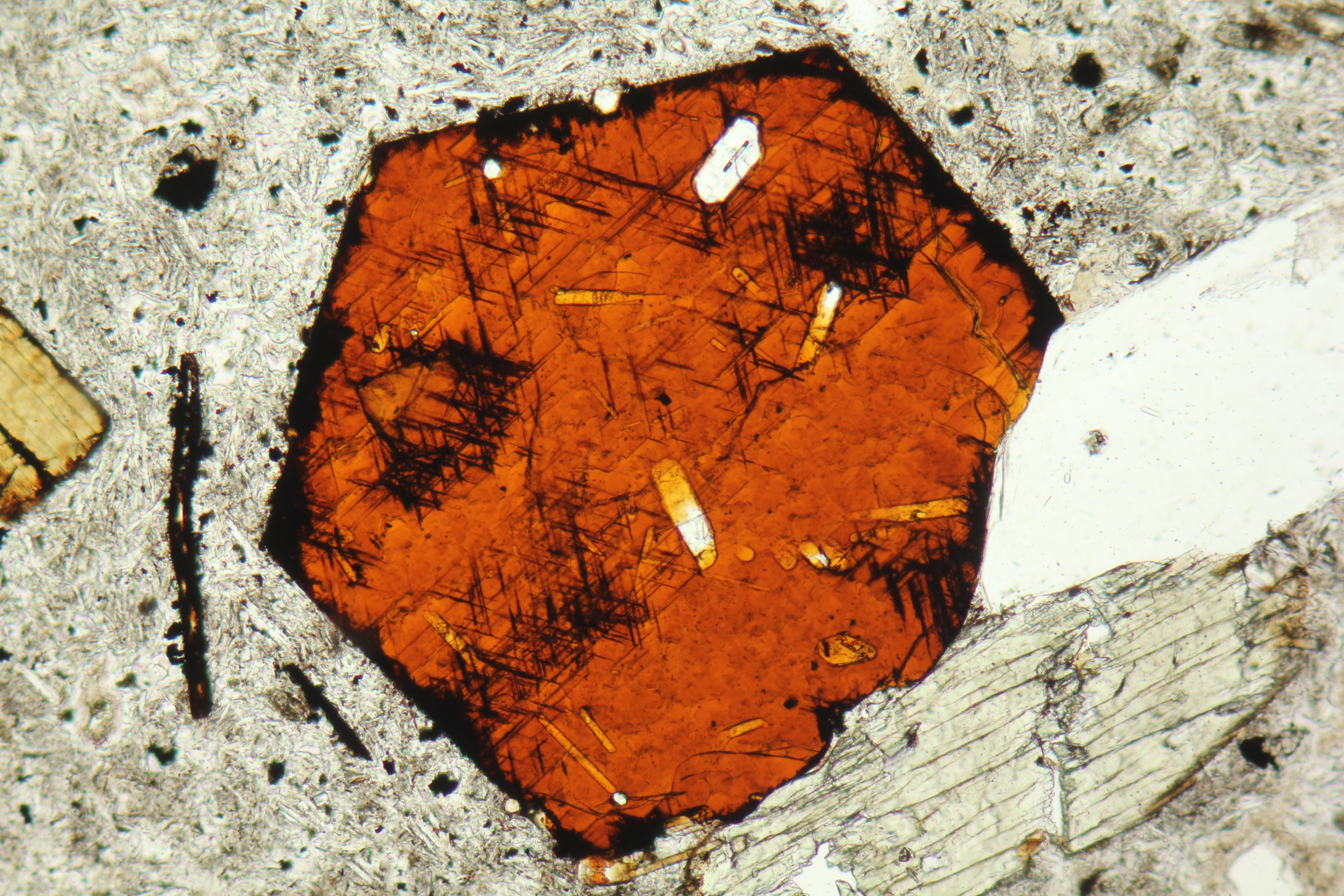
Basal section of biotite, with needle-like rutile inclusions, in thin section under plane-polarized light

=== Crystallographic structure ===
Like other micas, biotite has a crystal structure described as TOT-c, meaning that it is composed of parallel TOT layers weakly bonded to each other by cations (c). The TOT layers in turn consist of two tetrahedral sheets (T) strongly bonded to the two faces of a single octahedral sheet (O). It is the relatively weak ionic bonding between TOT layers that gives biotite its perfect basal cleavage.

The tetrahedral sheets consist of silica tetrahedra, which are silicon ions surrounded by four oxygen ions. In biotite, one in four silicon ions is replaced by an aluminium ion. The tetrahedra each share three of their four oxygen ions with neighboring tetrahedra to produce a hexagonal sheet. The remaining oxygen ion (the apical oxygen ion) is available to bond to the octahedral sheet.

The octahedral sheet in biotite is a trioctahedral sheet, with the structure of the mineral brucite, with magnesium or ferrous iron as the usual cations. Apical oxygens replace some of the hydroxyl ions that would be present in a brucite sheet, thereby bonding the tetrahedral sheets tightly to the octahedral sheet.

Tetrahedral sheets have a strong negative charge, since their bulk composition is AlSi_{3}O_{10}^{5-}. The trioctahedral sheet carries a positive charge because its bulk composition is M_{3}(OH)_{2}^{4+} (where M represents a divalent ion such as ferrous iron or magnesium). The combined TOT layer has a residual negative charge, since its bulk composition is M_{3}(AlSi_{3}O_{10})(OH)_{2}^{−}. The remaining negative charge of the TOT layer is neutralized by the interlayer potassium ions.

Because the hexagons in the T and O sheets differ slightly in size, the sheets are slightly distorted when they bond to form a TOT layer. This breaks the hexagonal symmetry, reducing it to monoclinic symmetry. However, the original hexahedral symmetry is discernible in the pseudohexagonal character of biotite crystals.

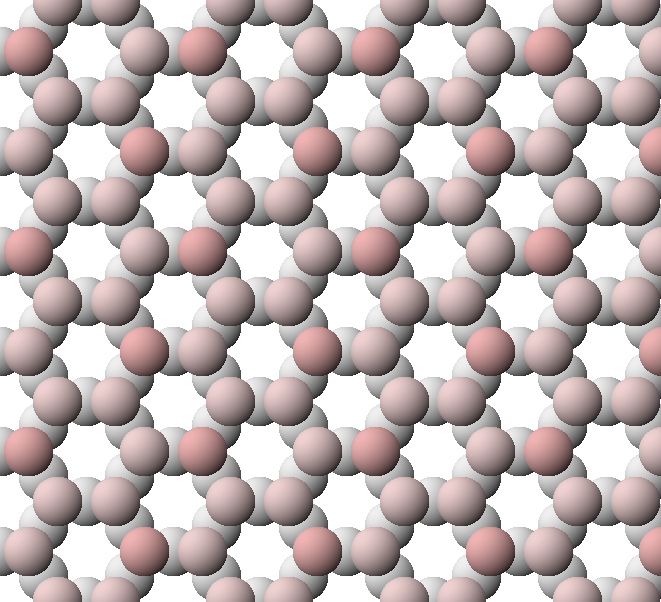
View of tetrahedral sheet structure of biotite. The apical oxygen ions are tinted pink.

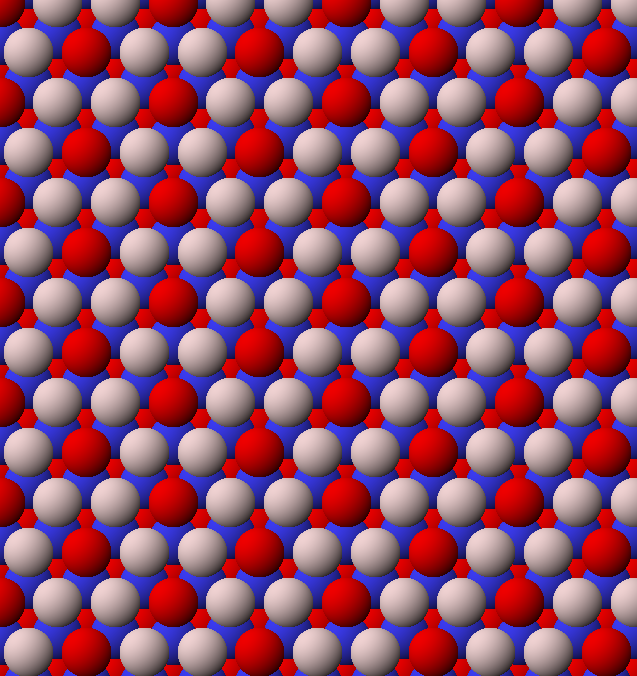
View of trioctahedral sheet structure of biotite. The binding sites for apical oxygen are shown as white spheres. Red spheres are hydroxide ions.

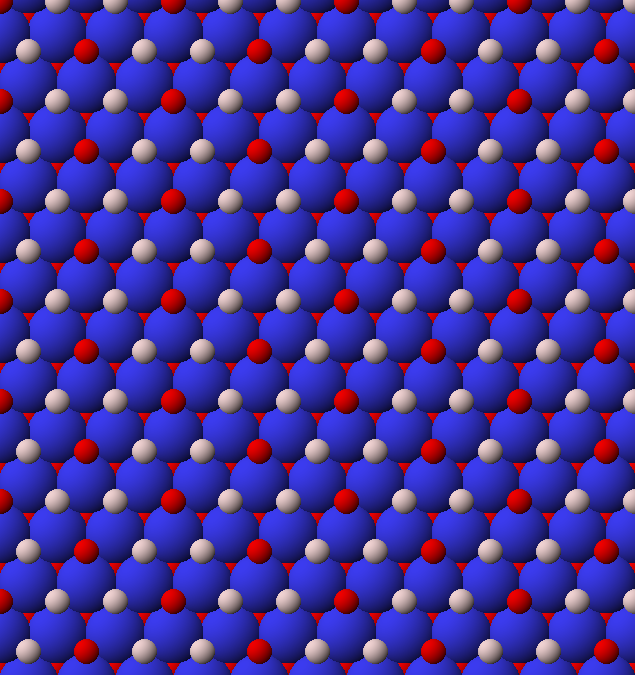
View of trioctahedral sheet structure of mica emphasizing magnesium or iron sites

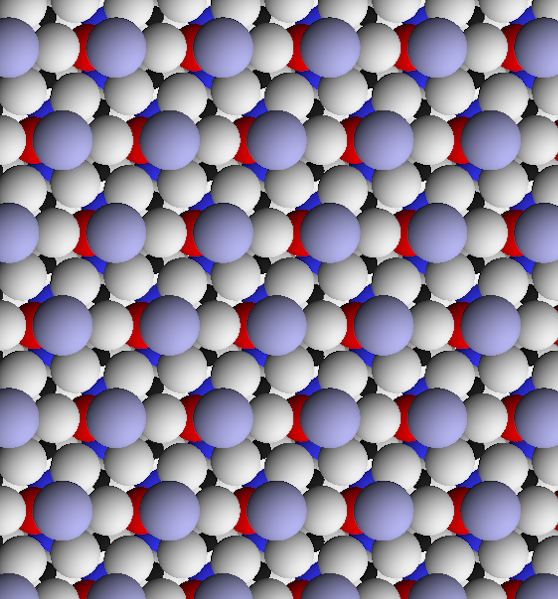
View of biotite structure looking at surface of a single layer

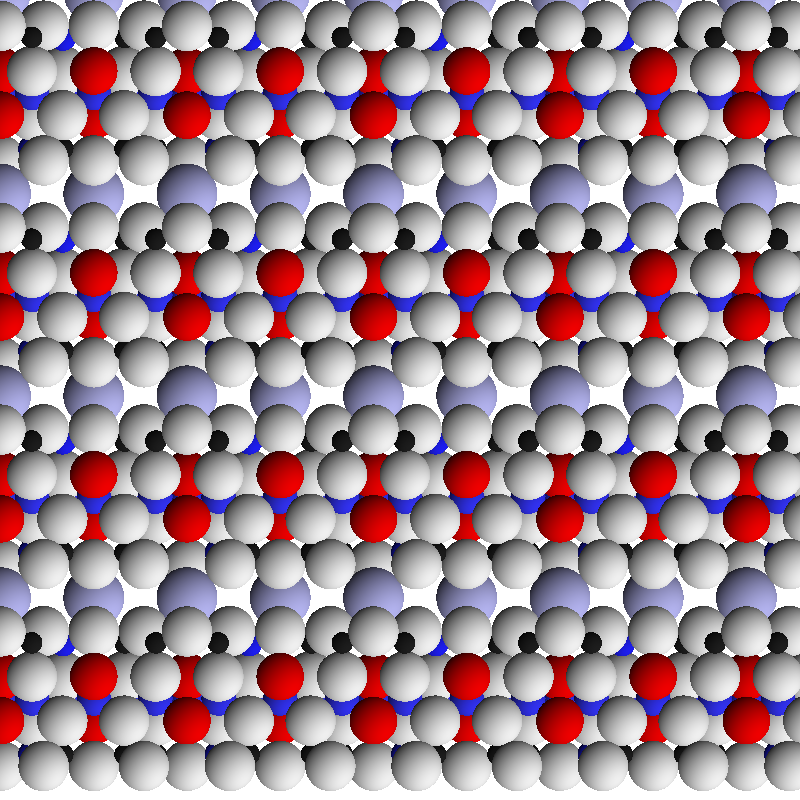
View of biotite structure looking along sheets

== Occurrence ==
Members of the biotite group are found in a wide variety of igneous and metamorphic rocks. For instance, biotite occurs in the lava of Mount Vesuvius and in the Monzoni intrusive complex of the western Dolomites. Biotite in granite tends to be poorer in magnesium than the biotite found in its volcanic equivalent, rhyolite. Biotite is an essential phenocryst in some varieties of lamprophyre. Biotite is occasionally found in large cleavable crystals, especially in pegmatite veins, as in New England, Virginia and North Carolina USA. Other notable occurrences include Bancroft and Sudbury, Ontario Canada. It is an essential constituent of many metamorphic schists, and it forms in suitable compositions over a wide range of pressure and temperature. It has been estimated that biotite comprises up to 7% of the exposed continental crust.

An igneous rock composed almost entirely of dark mica (biotite or phlogopite) is known as a glimmerite or biotitite.

Biotite may be found in association with its common alteration product chlorite.

The largest documented single crystals of biotite were approximately 7 m^{2} (75 sq ft) sheets found in Iveland Municipality, Norway.

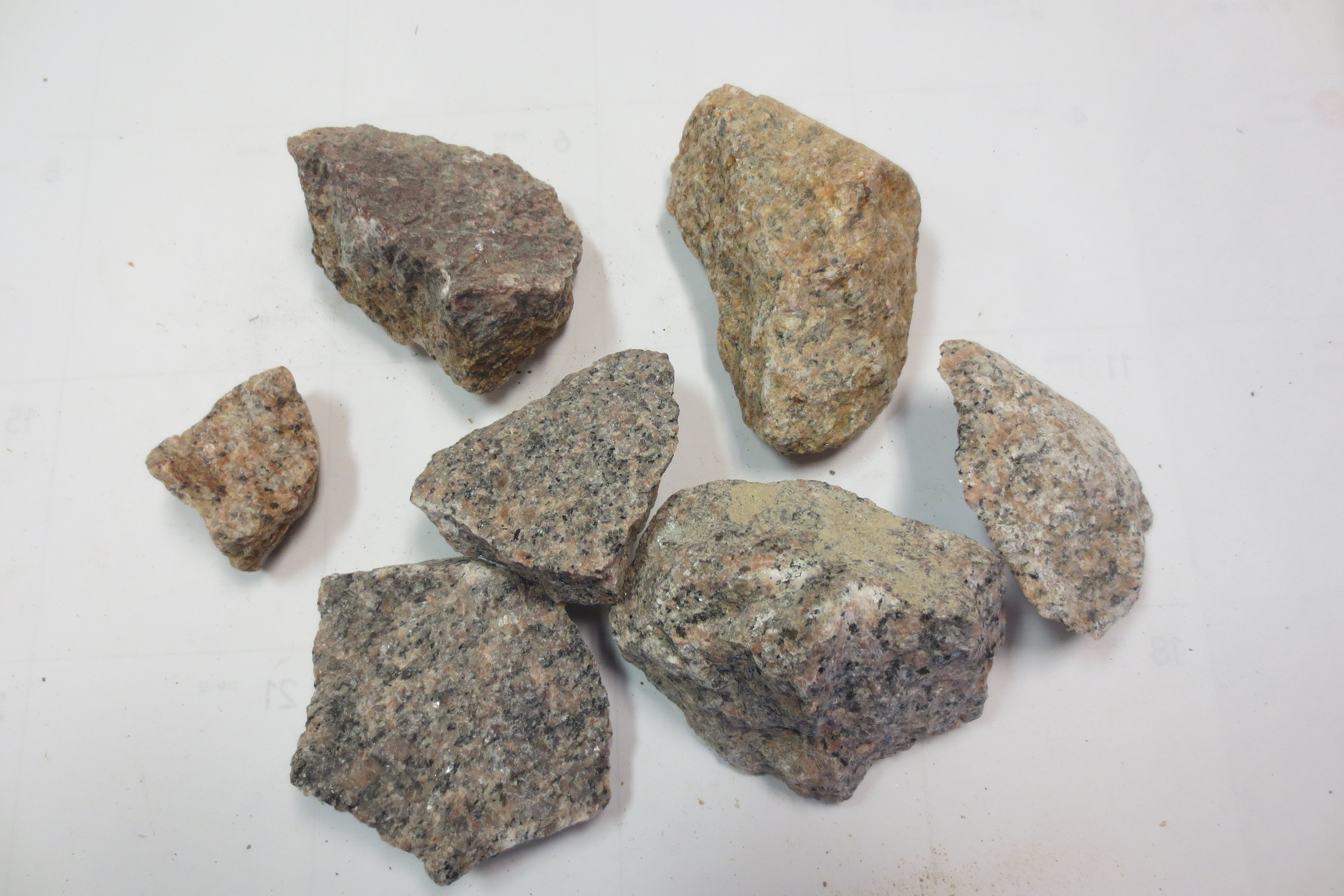
Biotite-bearing granite samples (small black minerals)

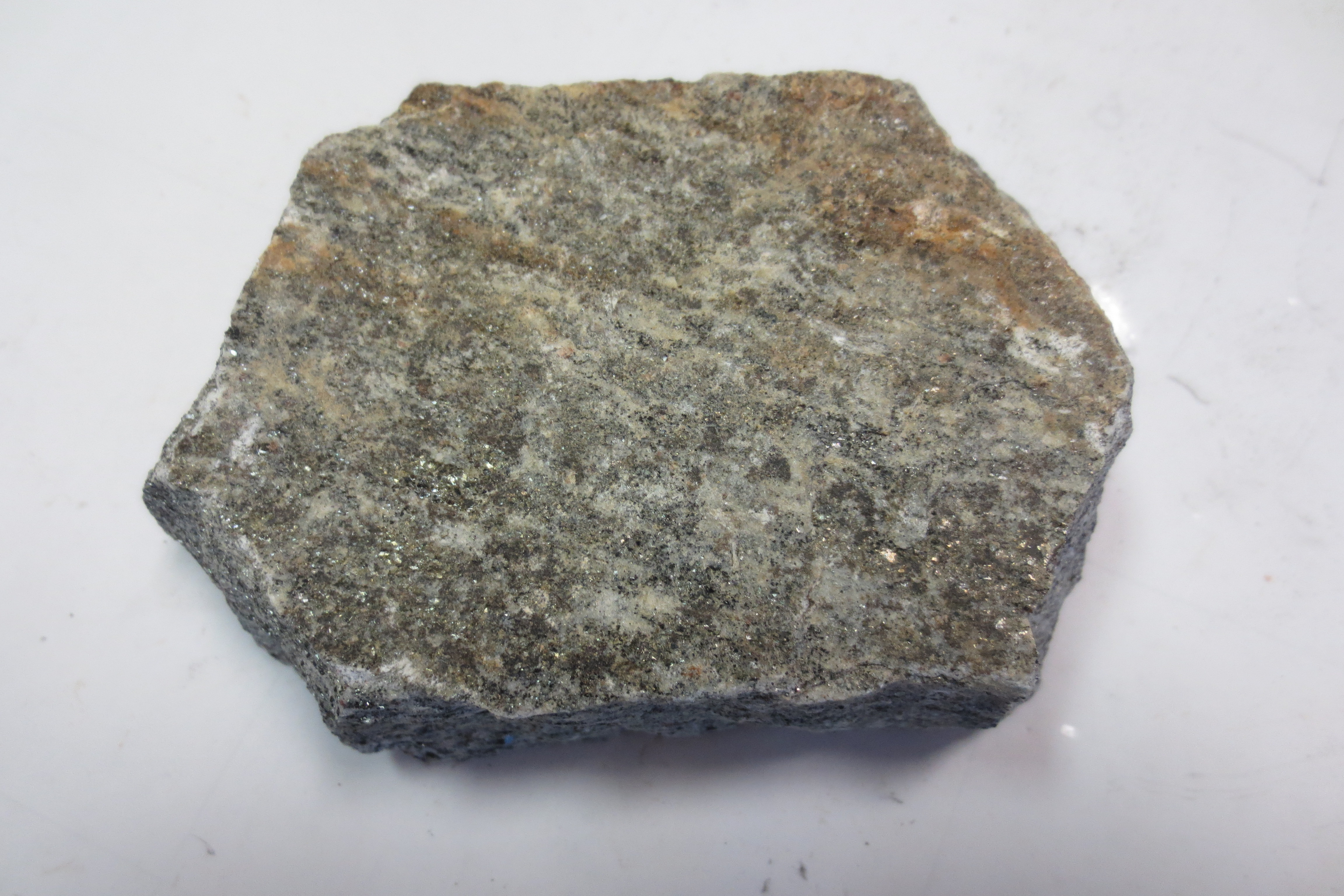
Biotite-bearing gneiss sample

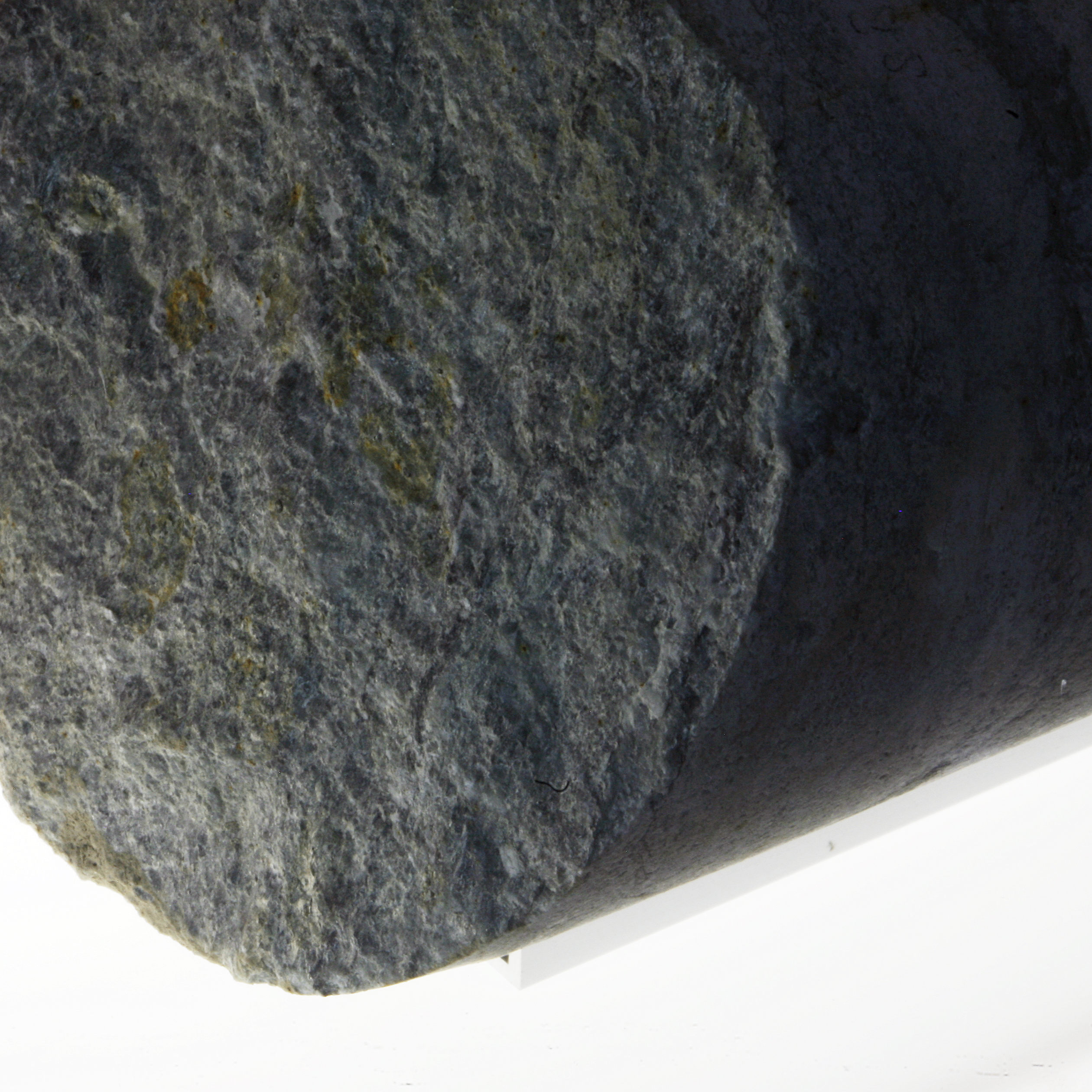
Gneiss sample bearing biotite and chlorite (green), a common alteration product of biotite

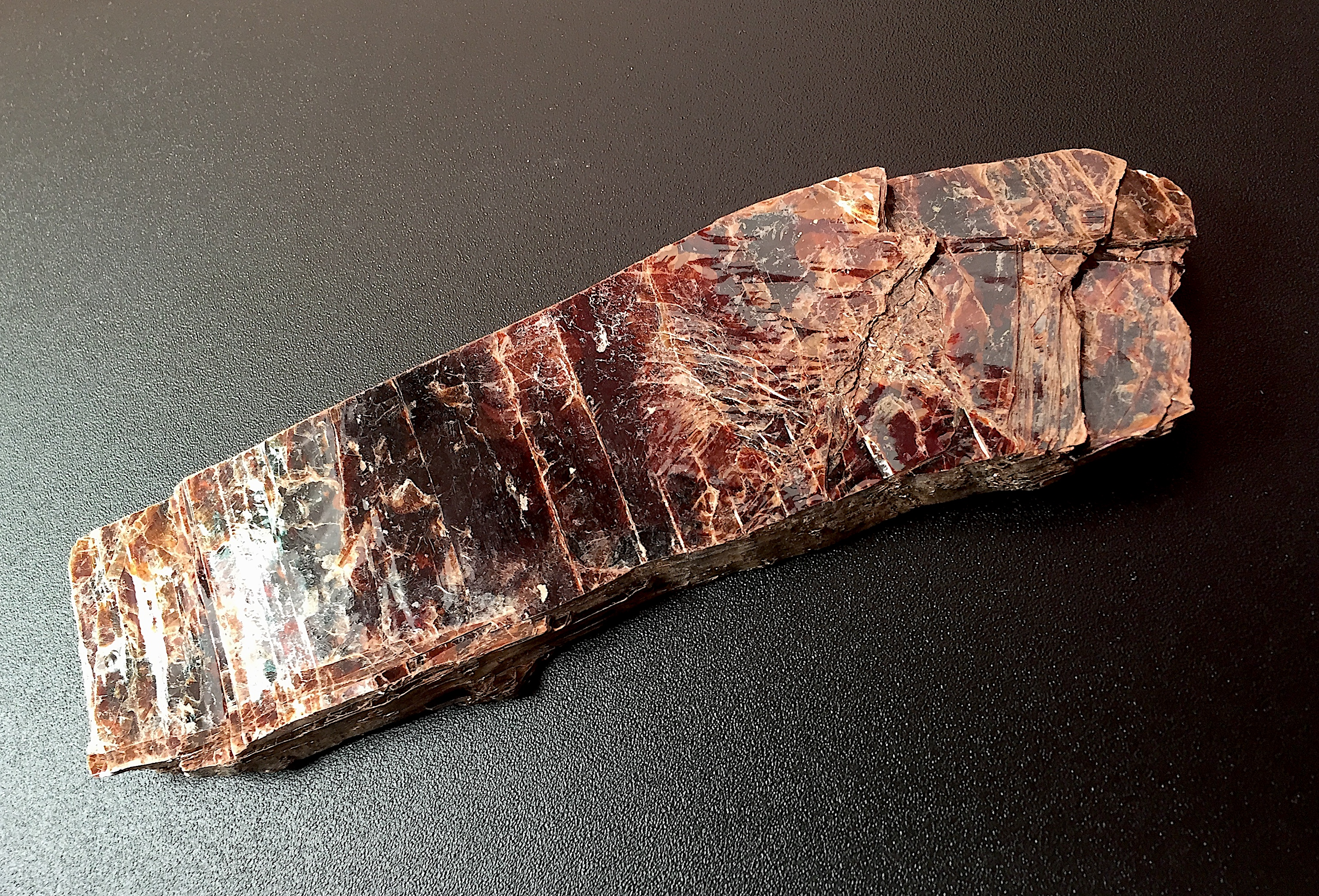
Glimmerite from Namibia

== Dating and geothermometry ==
Biotite is used extensively to constrain rock ages by either potassium–argon dating or argon–argon dating. Because argon escapes readily from the biotite crystal structure at high temperatures, these methods may provide only minimum ages for many rocks. Biotite is also useful for assessing the temperature histories of metamorphic rocks because the partitioning of iron and magnesium between biotite and garnet is temperature-sensitive.

== Bibliography ==
- Nesse, William D. (2000). Introduction to mineralogy. New York: Oxford University Press. p. 238. ISBN 9780195106916.
