= Dormant =

Dormant, "sleeping", may refer to:

== Science ==
- Dormancy in an organism's life cycle
- Dormant volcano, a volcano that is inactive but may become active in the future

== Culture ==
- Dormant, a heraldry attitude signifying a sleeping animal with head resting upon paws
- Dormant title, an hereditary title of nobility or baronetcy for which the rightful claimant has yet to be found
- Dormant, an order of knighthood which is no longer conferred
- Dormant (film), an Argentine documentary film

== Economics ==
- Dormant company, a currently inactive company
- Dormant bank account, a bank account which lacks activity
