= Bird's eye extinction =

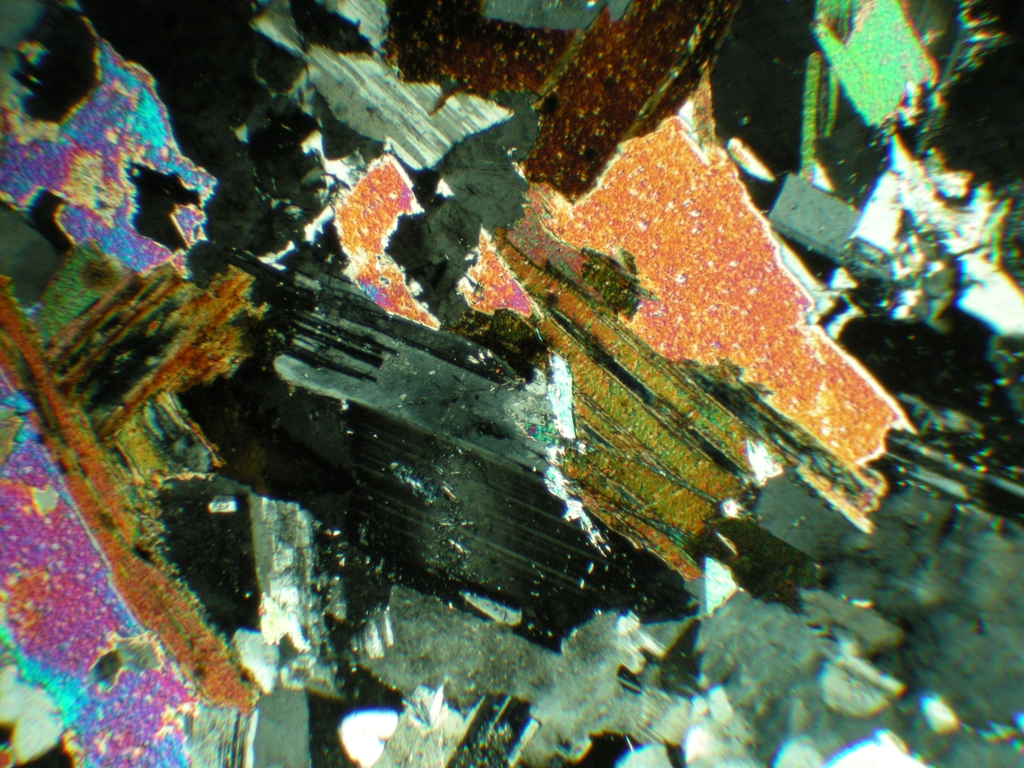
Granite sample under cross polarized light containing plagioclase, quartz, and mica. The mica in orange here exhibits the bird's eye extinction pattern.

Bird's eye extinction, or bird's eye maple, is a specific type of extinction exhibited by minerals of the mica group under cross polarized light of the petrographic microscope. It gives the mineral a pebbly appearance as it passes into extinction. This is caused when the grinding tools used to create petrographic thin sections of precise thickness alter the alignment of the previously perfect basal cleavage planes which split micas up into its characteristic thin sheets. The resulting, slightly roughened surface alters the extinction angle of various parts of the crystal lattice, leading to this type of extinction. Since it is not a natural feature of the mineral, bird's eye extinction is not observed in all mica crystals, nor from all angles, but it is quite common, and is used as a diagnostic feature for micas.

Common micas which exhibit this include biotite (and the magnesium end-member phlogopite) and muscovite.
