= Extent =

Extent may refer to:

== Computing ==
- Extent (file systems), a contiguous region of computer storage medium reserved for a file
- Extent File System, a discontinued file system implementation named after the contiguous region
- Extent, a chunk of storage space logical volume management uses internally to provide various device mappings
- Extent, in computer programming, is the period during which a variable has a particular value

== Other ==
- Extent, a technical description of the wingspan of a bird, bat, or other flying animal
- Extent, a writ allowing a creditor to seize or assume temporary ownership of a debtor's property; also, the actual seizure in its execution
- Extent, ringing all possible permutations of bells in change ringing
- Map extent, the portion of a region shown in a map

== See also ==
- Extant (disambiguation)
