= Dormant (film) =

Dormant (Spanish: La vida dormida) is a 2020 Argentine documentary film directed by Natalia Labaké. The 74‑minute feature weaves together her grandmother’s 1990s home videos—capturing the public life of lawyer‑politician Juan Labaké—with present‑day footage focused on the women of the family, especially Labaké’s sister and aunt. Contrasting past and present images, the film highlights how women remained on the sidelines of political life and explores the lingering effects of that marginalization. Dormant premiered at IDFA 2020 and received a special jury mention for creative use of archive footage.
