= Extant =

Extant is the opposite of the word extinct. It may refer to:

- Neontology, the study of extant taxa
- Extant hereditary titles
- Extant literature, surviving literature, such as Beowulf, the oldest extant manuscript written in English
- Extant taxon, a taxon which is not extinct, such as an extant species
- Extant Theatre Company, a disability arts organisation
- Extant (TV series), an American television series
- Hank Hall, also known as Extant, a DC Comics supervillain

== See also ==
- Extent (disambiguation)
