= Undulose extinction =

Undulose extinction of quartz in Orthogneiss

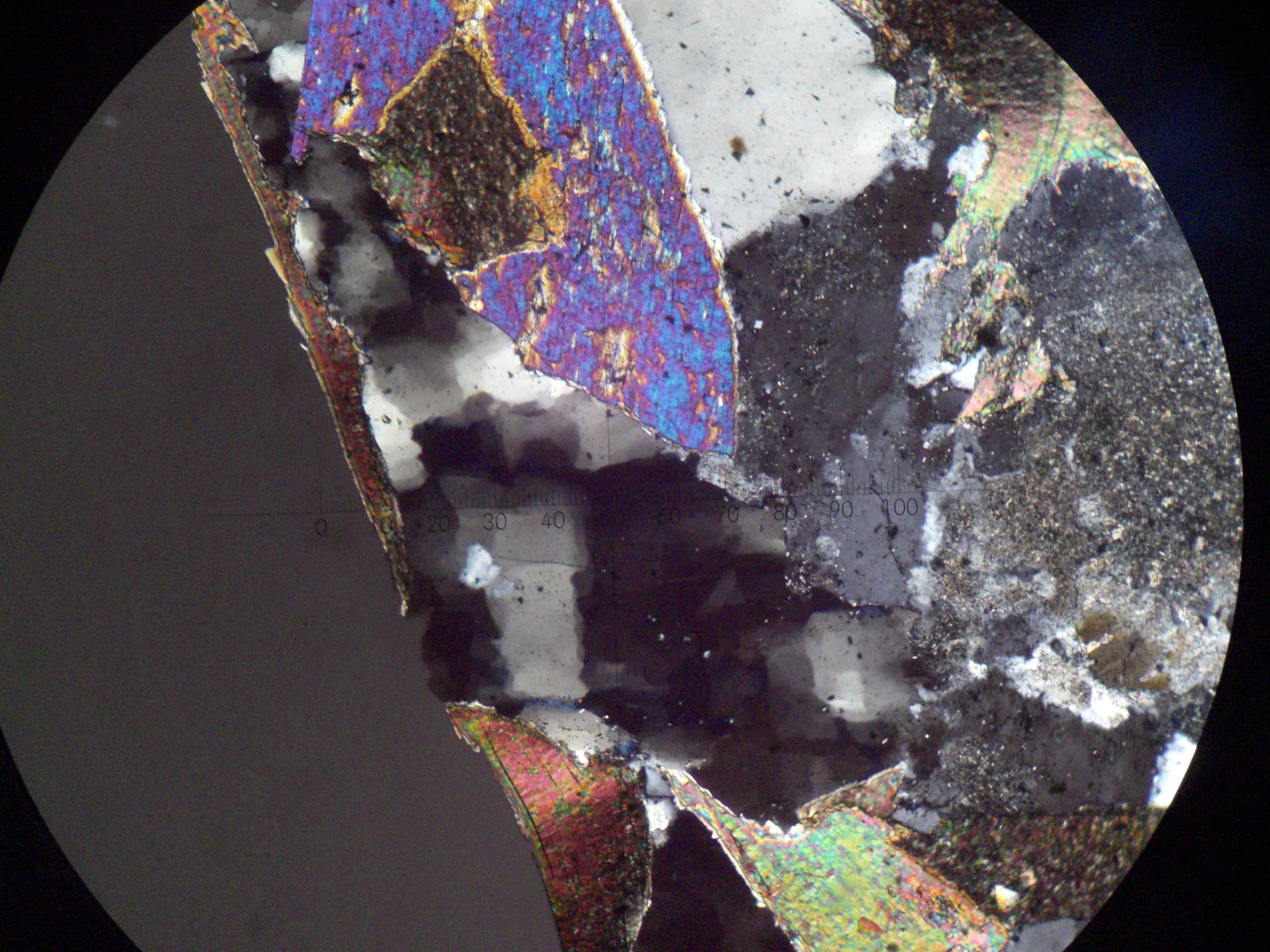

Undulose extinction or undulatory extinction is a geological term referring to the type of extinction that occurs in certain minerals when examined in thin section under cross polarized light. As the microscope stage is rotated, individual mineral grains appear black when the polarization due to the mineral prevents any light from passing through. If a mineral is deformed plastically by dislocation processes without recovery, strain builds up within the crystal lattice causing it to warp. This means that different parts of a crystal reach extinction at slightly different angles, giving the crystal an irregular, mottled look.

Undulose extinction is very common in quartz, so much so that it is often used as a diagnostic feature of that mineral, and feldspar of various sorts, but is possible in almost any mineral.

The presence of undulose extinction may help to infer that a crystal grew before a deformation event. However, some minerals acquire undulose extinction easily and even under the effect of minor or local deformations.
