= Thin section =

Thin slice of a material prepared for microscopic examination

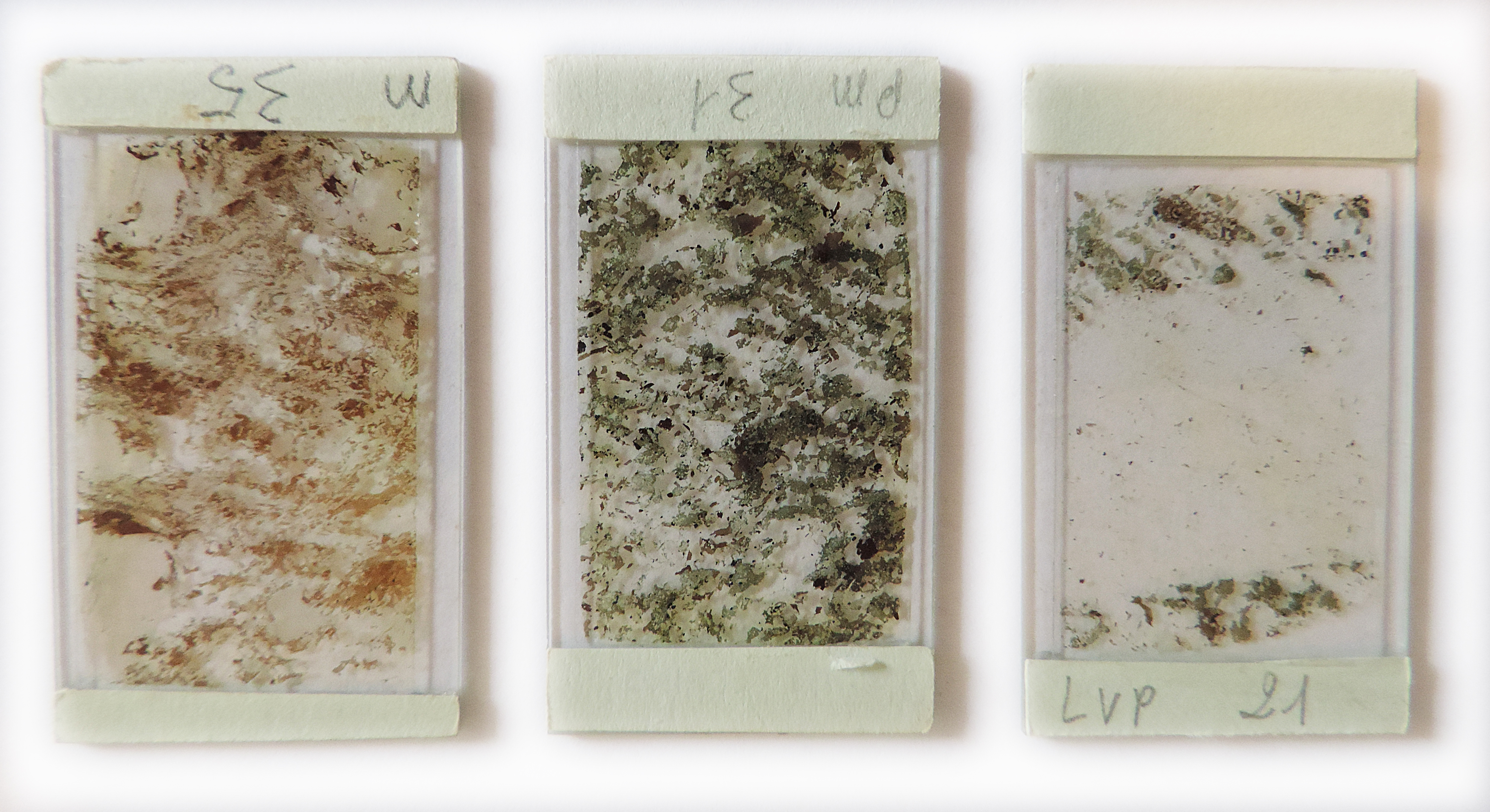
Three thin sections of rock

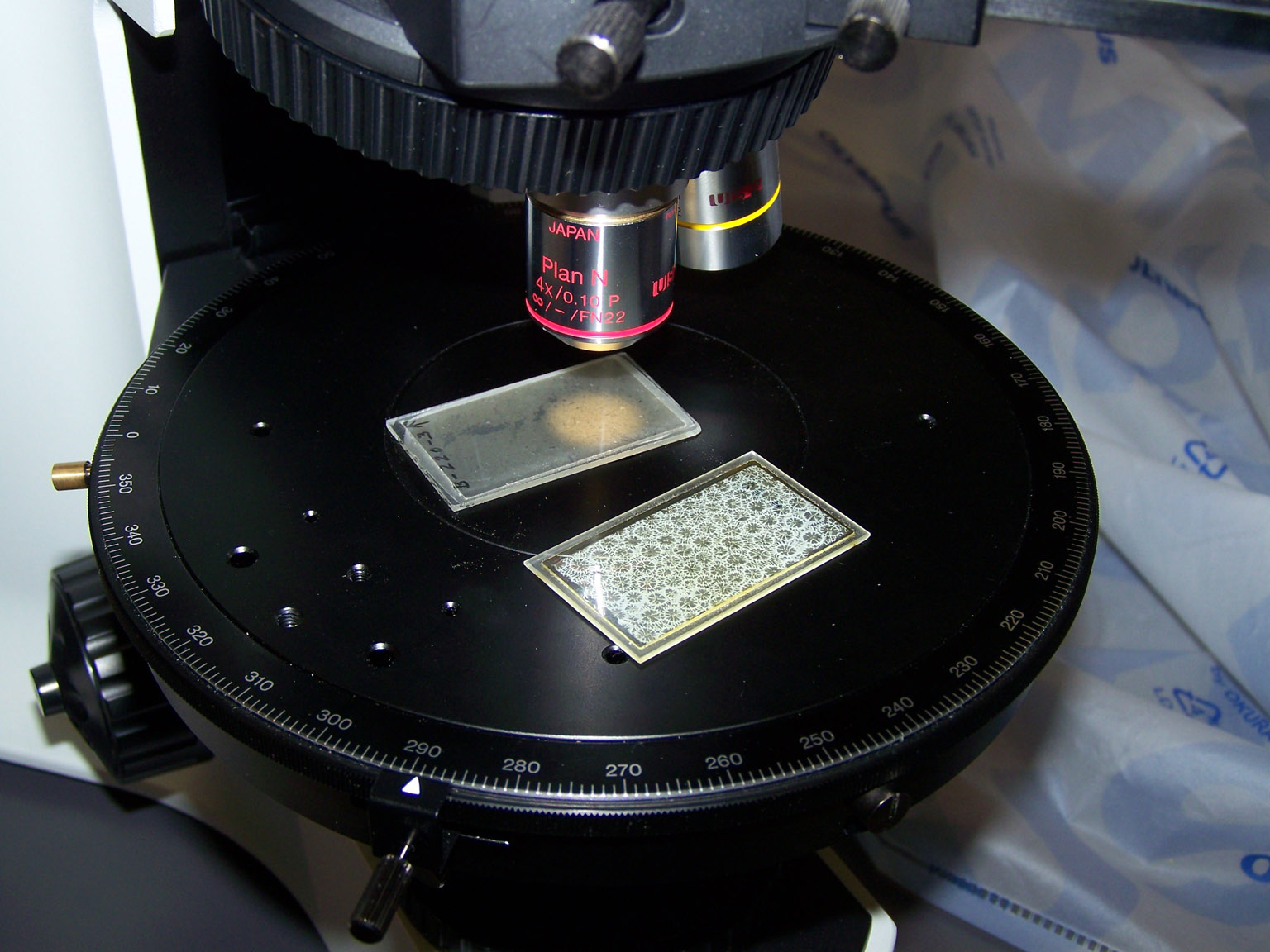
Thin sections under a petrographic microscope

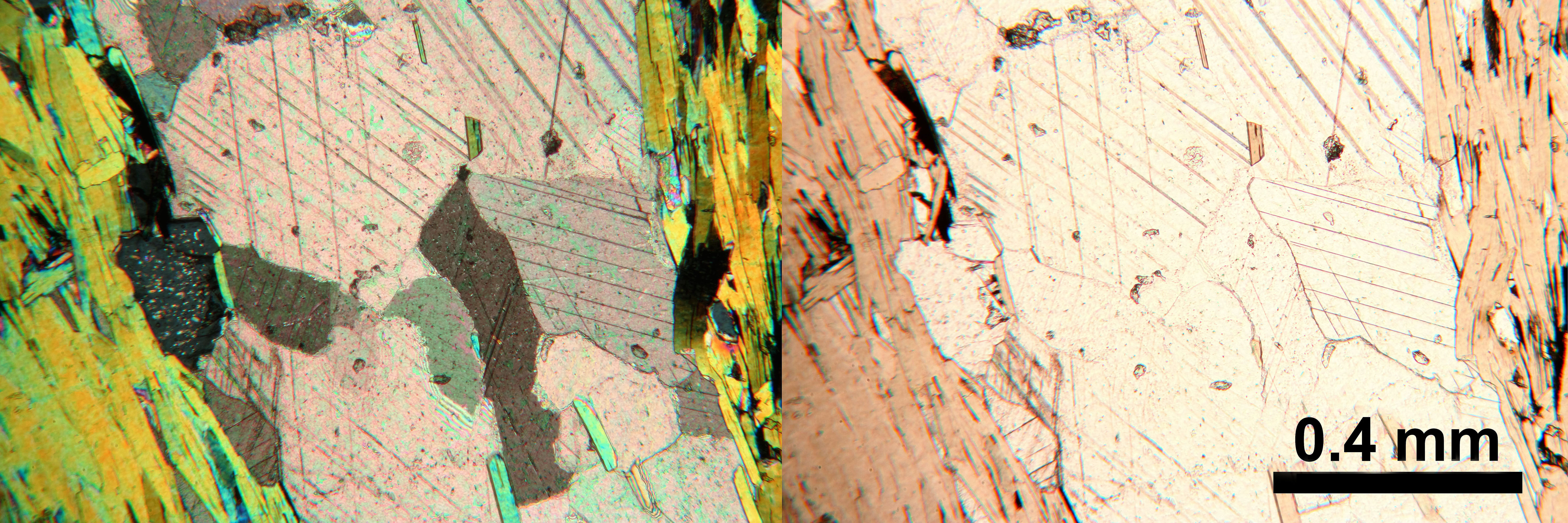
Photomicrographs of a thin section containing a carbonate vein in mica rich rock. In cross-polarized light on left, plane-polarized light on right.

In optical mineralogy and petrography, a thin section (or petrographic thin section) is a thin slice of a rock or mineral sample, prepared in a laboratory, for use with a polarizing petrographic microscope, electron microscope and electron microprobe. A thin sliver of rock is cut from the sample with a diamond saw and ground optically flat. It is then mounted on a glass slide and then ground smooth using progressively finer abrasive grit until the sample is only 30 μm thick. The method uses the Michel-Lévy interference colour chart to determine thickness, typically using quartz as the thickness gauge because it is one of the most abundant minerals.

When placed between two polarizing filters set at right angles to each other, the optical properties of the minerals in the thin section alter the colour and intensity of the light as seen by the viewer. As different minerals have different optical properties, most rock-forming minerals can be easily identified. Plagioclase for example can be seen in the photo on the right as a clear mineral with multiple parallel twinning planes. The large blue-green minerals are clinopyroxene with some exsolution of orthopyroxene.

Thin sections are prepared in order to investigate the optical properties of the minerals in the rock. This work is a part of petrology and helps to reveal the origin and evolution of the parent rock.

A photograph of a rock in thin section is often referred to as a photomicrograph.

Thin sections are also used in the microscopic study of bones, metals and ceramics.

== Quartz in thin section ==
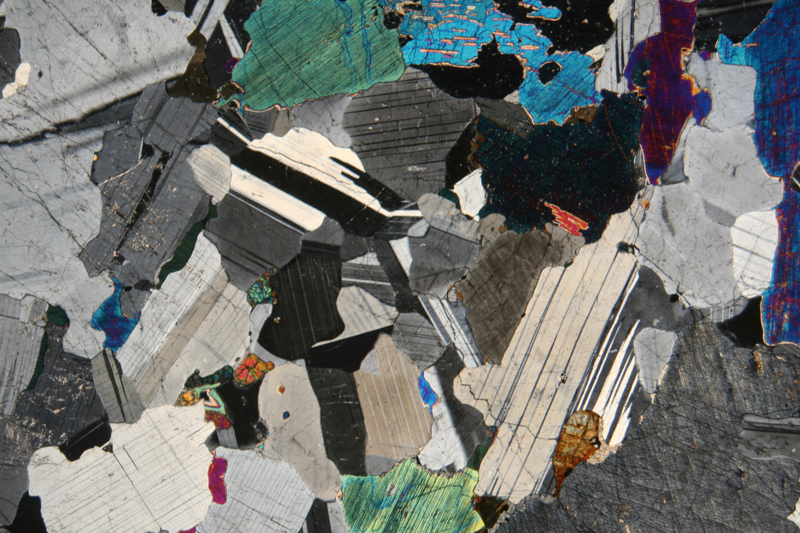
Photomicrograph of a thin section of gabbro

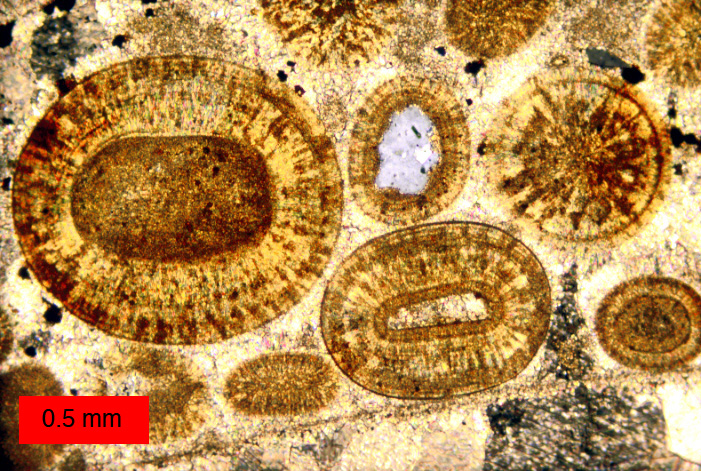
Photomicrograph of a thin section of a limestone with ooids. The largest is approximately 1.2 mm in diameter.

=== Description ===
In thin section, when viewed in plane polarized light (PPL), quartz is colorless with low relief and no cleavage. Its habit is either fairly equant or anhedral if it infills around other minerals as a cement. Under cross polarized light (XPL) quartz displays low interference colors and is usually the defining mineral used to determine if the thin section is at standardized thickness of 30 microns as quartz will only display up to a very pale yellow interference color and no further at that thickness, and it is very common in most rocks so it will likely be available to judge the thickness.

=== Determining provenance ===
In thin section, quartz grain provenance in a sedimentary rock can be estimated. In crossed polarized light, the quartz grain can go extinct all at once, called monocrystalline quartz, or in waves, called polycrystalline quartz. The extinction in waves is called undulose extinction and indicates dislocation walls in mineral grains. Dislocation walls are where dislocations, intracrystalline deformation via movement of a dislocation front within a plane, organize themselves into planes of sufficient quantity. They change the crystallographic orientation across the walls, so for example in quartz, the two sides of the wall will have slightly different extinction angles and thus result in undulose extinction. Since undulose extinction requires dislocation walls to have developed, and these occur more easily at higher pressures and temperatures, quartz grains with undulose extinction indicate metamorphic rock provenance for that grain. Those grains that are monocrystalline quartz are more likely to have been formed by igneous processes. Differing sources suggest the extent to which this proxy for provenance can be used. Some note the trend for immature sandstones to have less polycrystalline quartz grains compared to mature sandstones, which have grains that have passed through many sedimentary cycles. Quartz grains derived from previous sedimentary sources are determined by looking for authigenic, or grown in place, overgrowths of silica cement over the grain.

=== Other distinguishing features ===
The above descriptions of quartz in thin section are usually enough to identify it. Minerals with similar appearance may include plagioclase, although it can be distinguished by the distinctive twinning in crossed-polarized light and cleavage in plane-polarized light, and cordierite, although it can be distinguished by twinning or inclusions in the grain. However, for certainty, other distinguishing features of quartz include the fact that it is uniaxial, it has a positive optic sign, length-slow sign of elongation, and zero degree extinction angle.

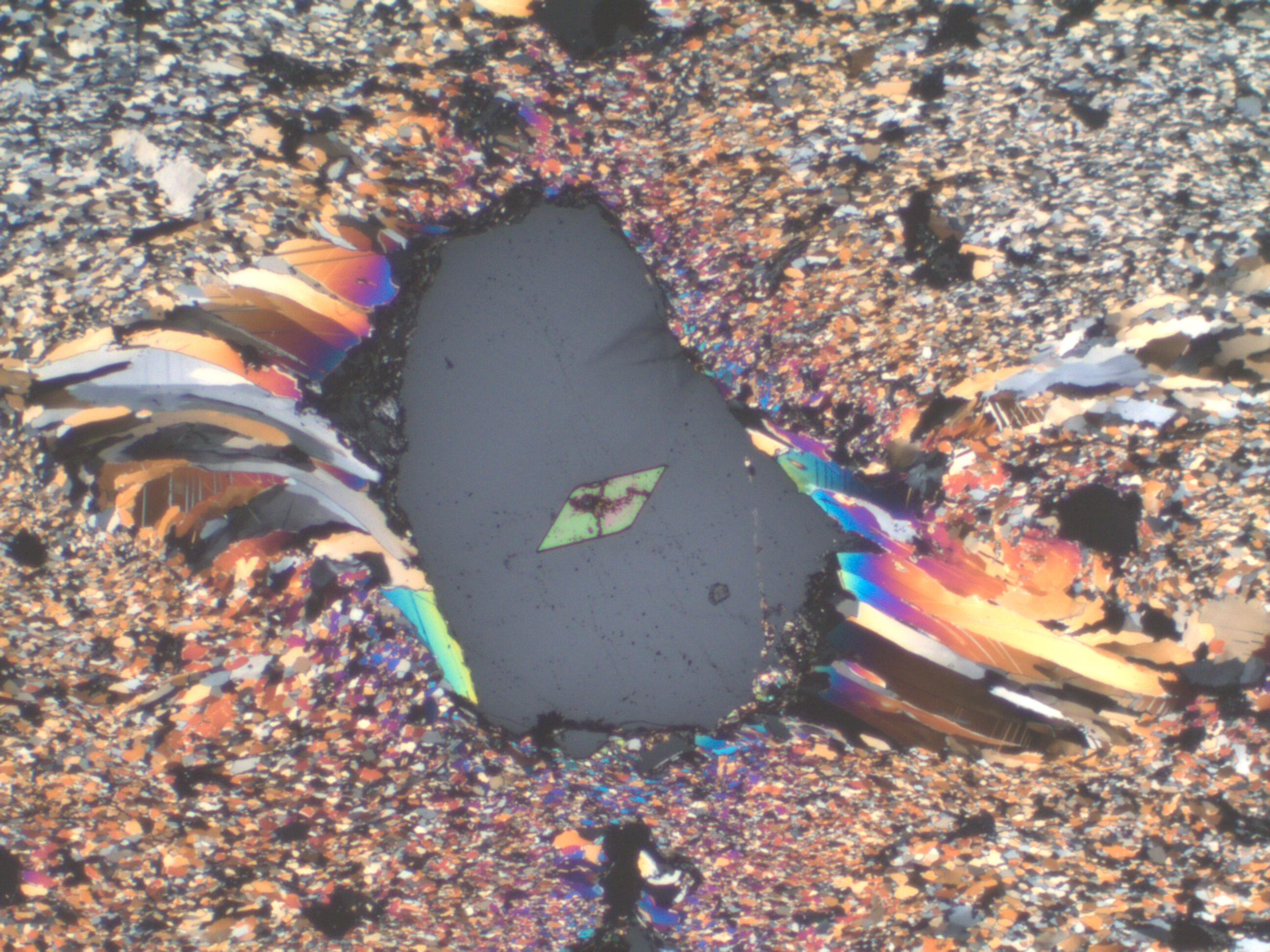
A sigma clast as seen in an ultra thin section. The uneven coloring is an artifact from uneven polishing.

== Ultra-thin sections ==
Fine-grained rocks, particularly those containing minerals of high birefringence, such as calcite, are sometimes prepared as ultra-thin sections. An ordinary 30 μm thin section is prepared as described above but the slice of rock is attached to the glass slide using a soluble cement such as Canada balsam (soluble in ethanol) to allow both sides to be worked on. The section is then polished on both sides using a fine diamond paste until it has a thickness in the range of 2–12 μm. This technique has been used to study the microstructure of fine-grained carbonates such as the Lochseitenkalk mylonite in which the matrix grains are less than 5 μm in size. This method is also sometimes used in the preparation of mineral and rock specimens for transmission electron microscopy and allows greater accuracy in comparing features using both optical and electron imaging.

== Gallery ==
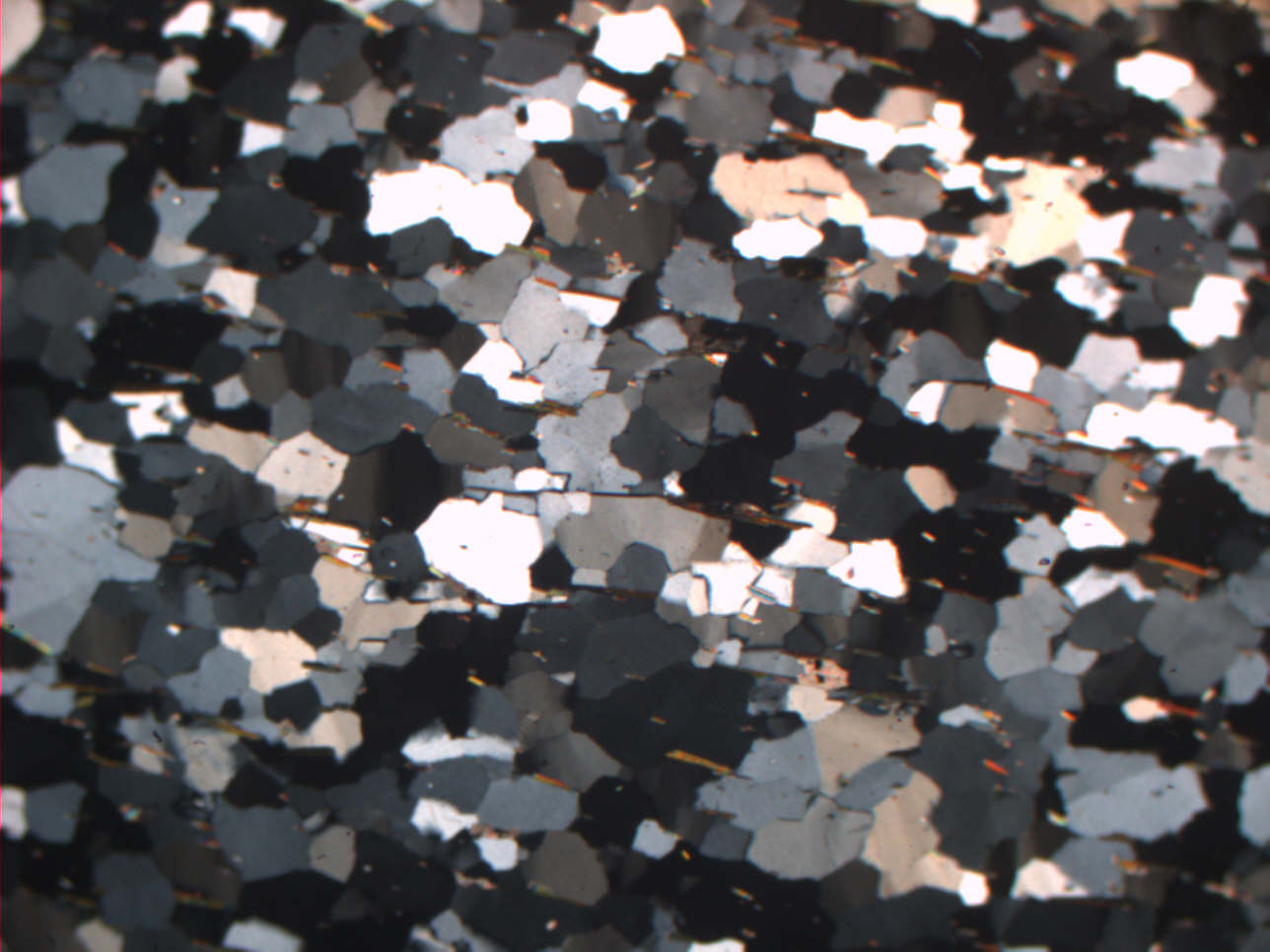
Quartzite

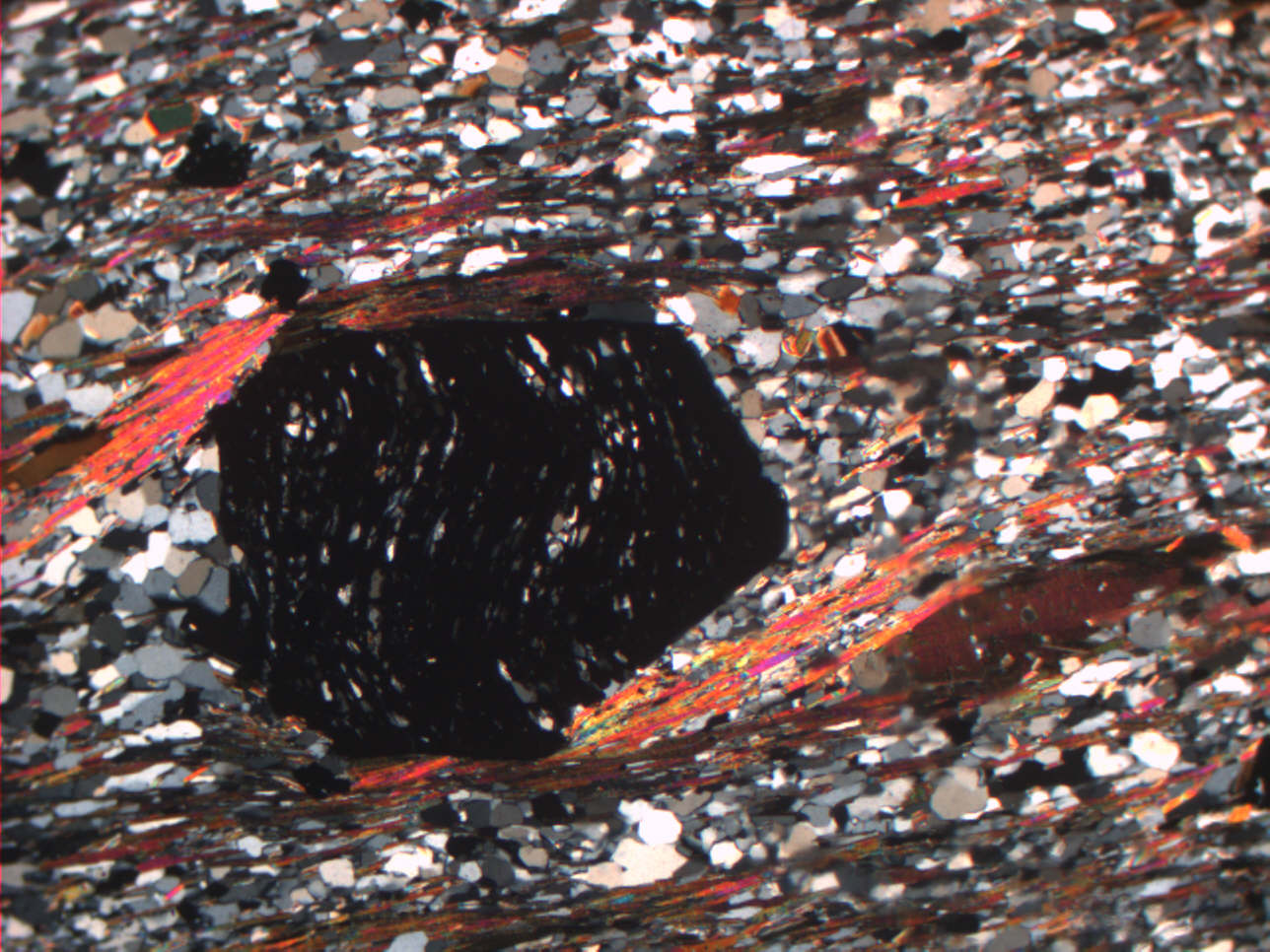
Garnet mica schist

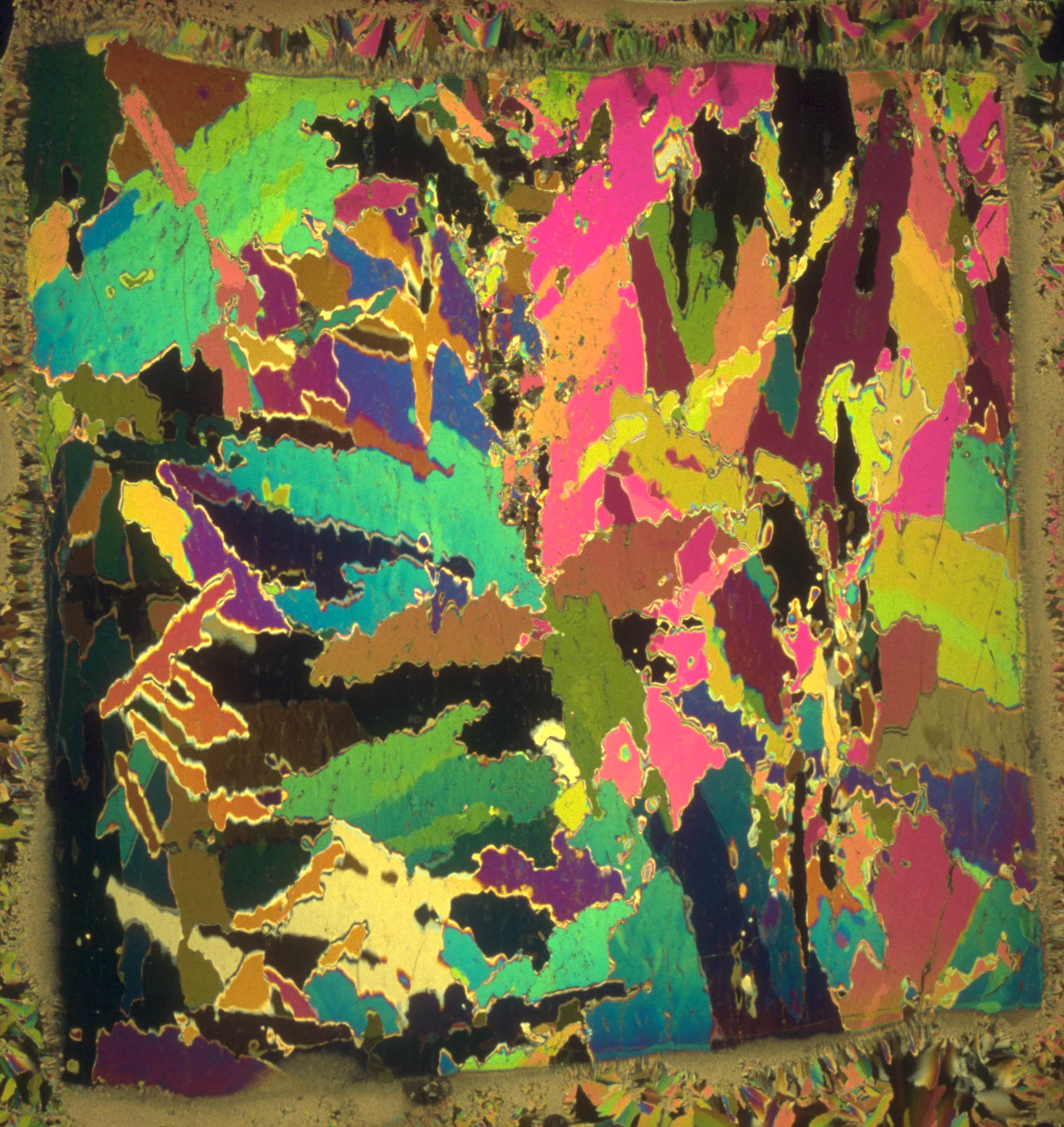
Ice

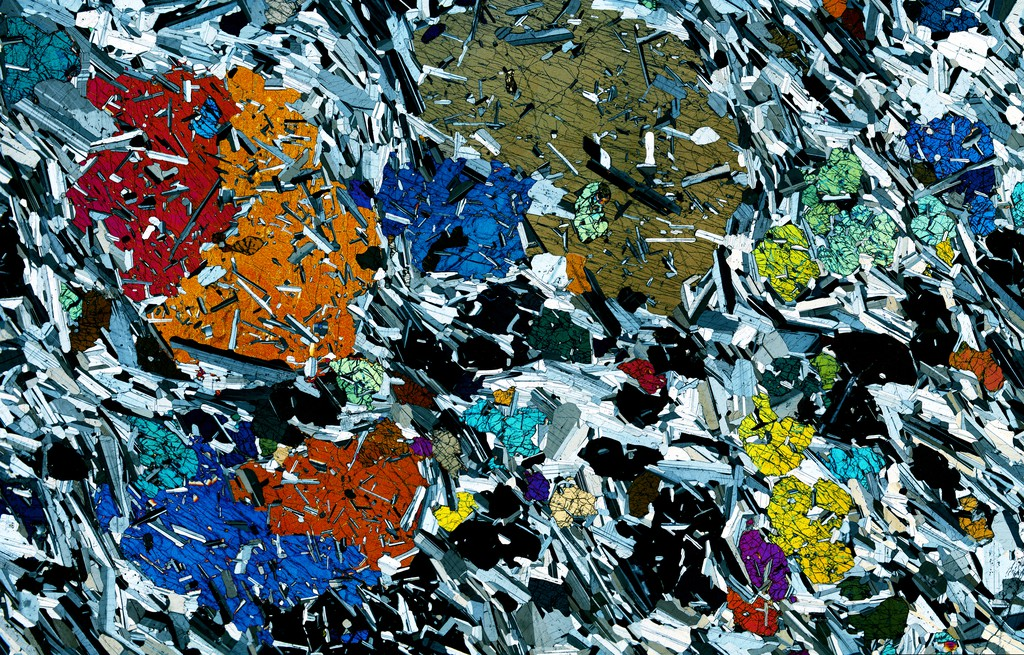
Gabbro from Rum, Scotland

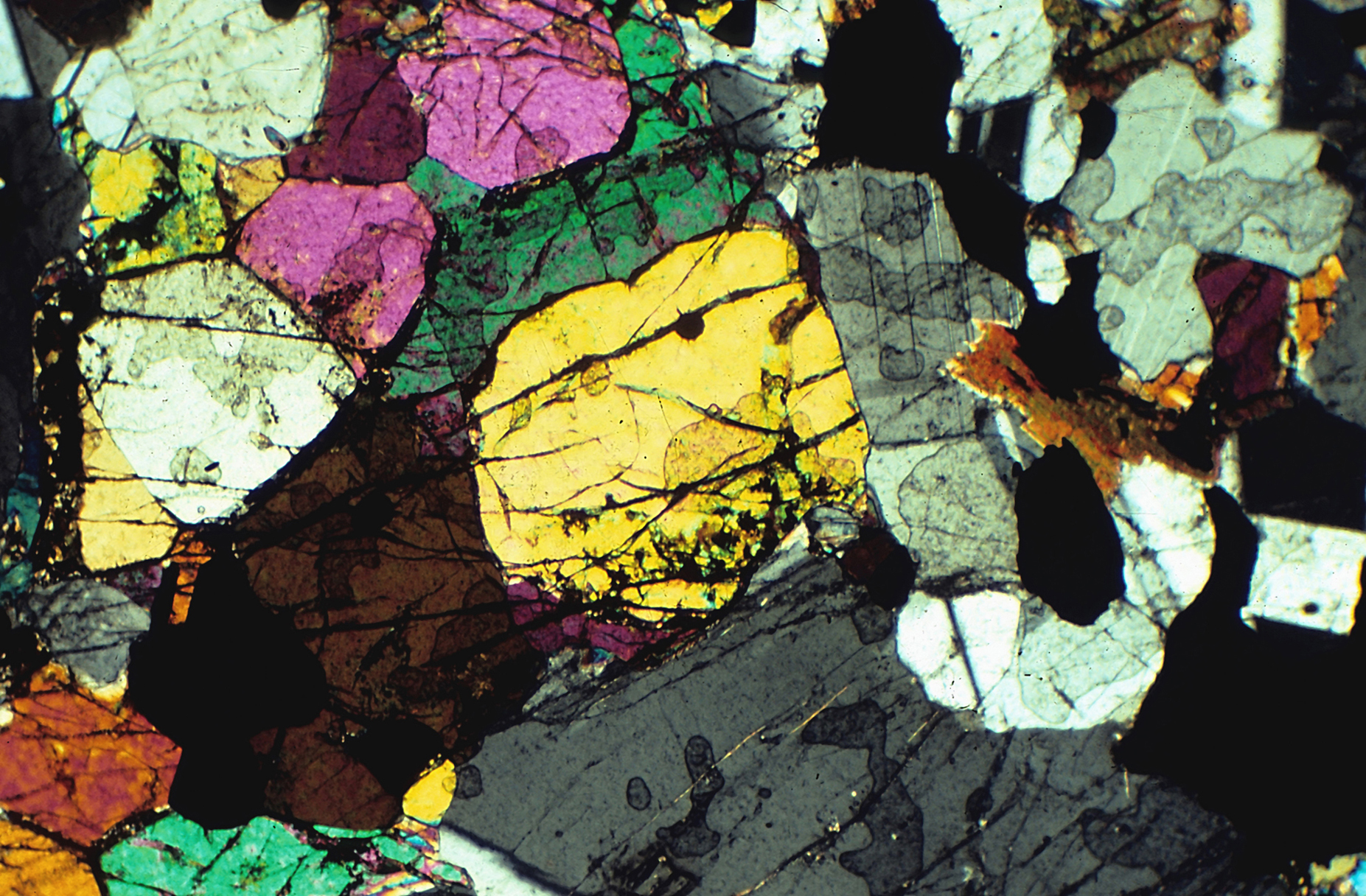
Bronzitite

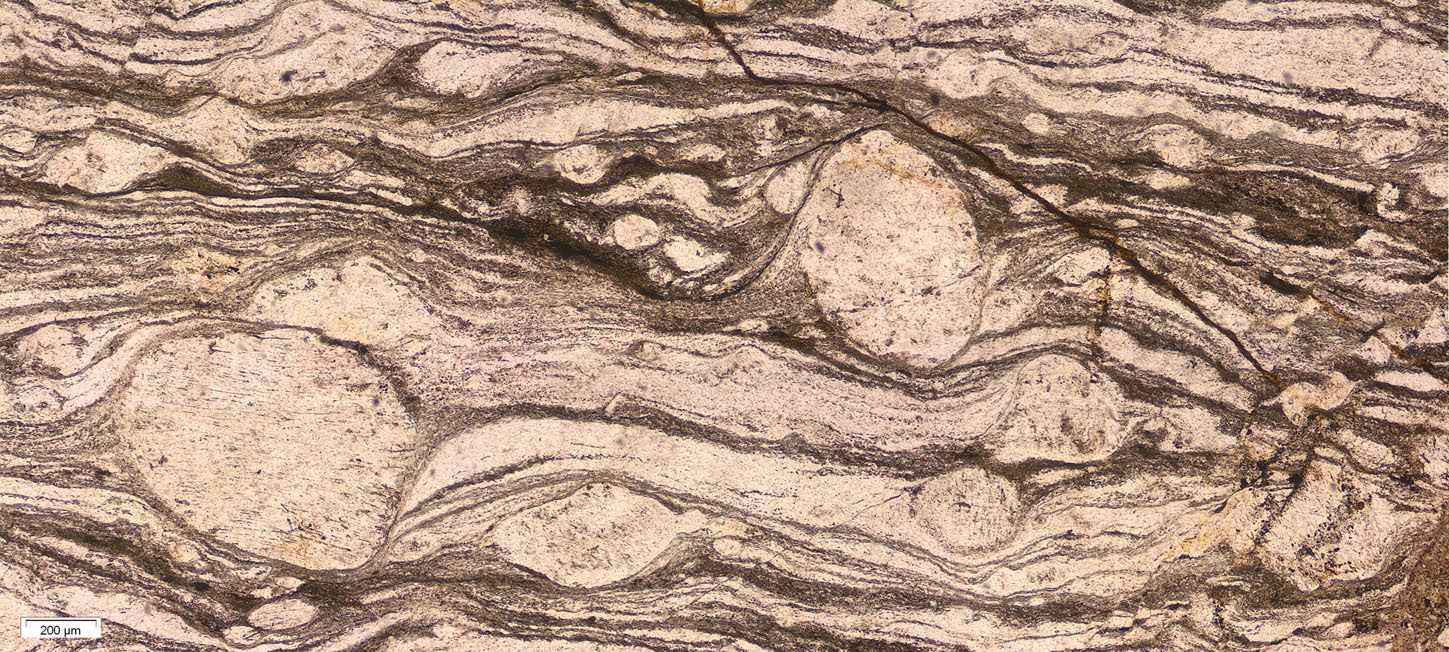
Mylonite

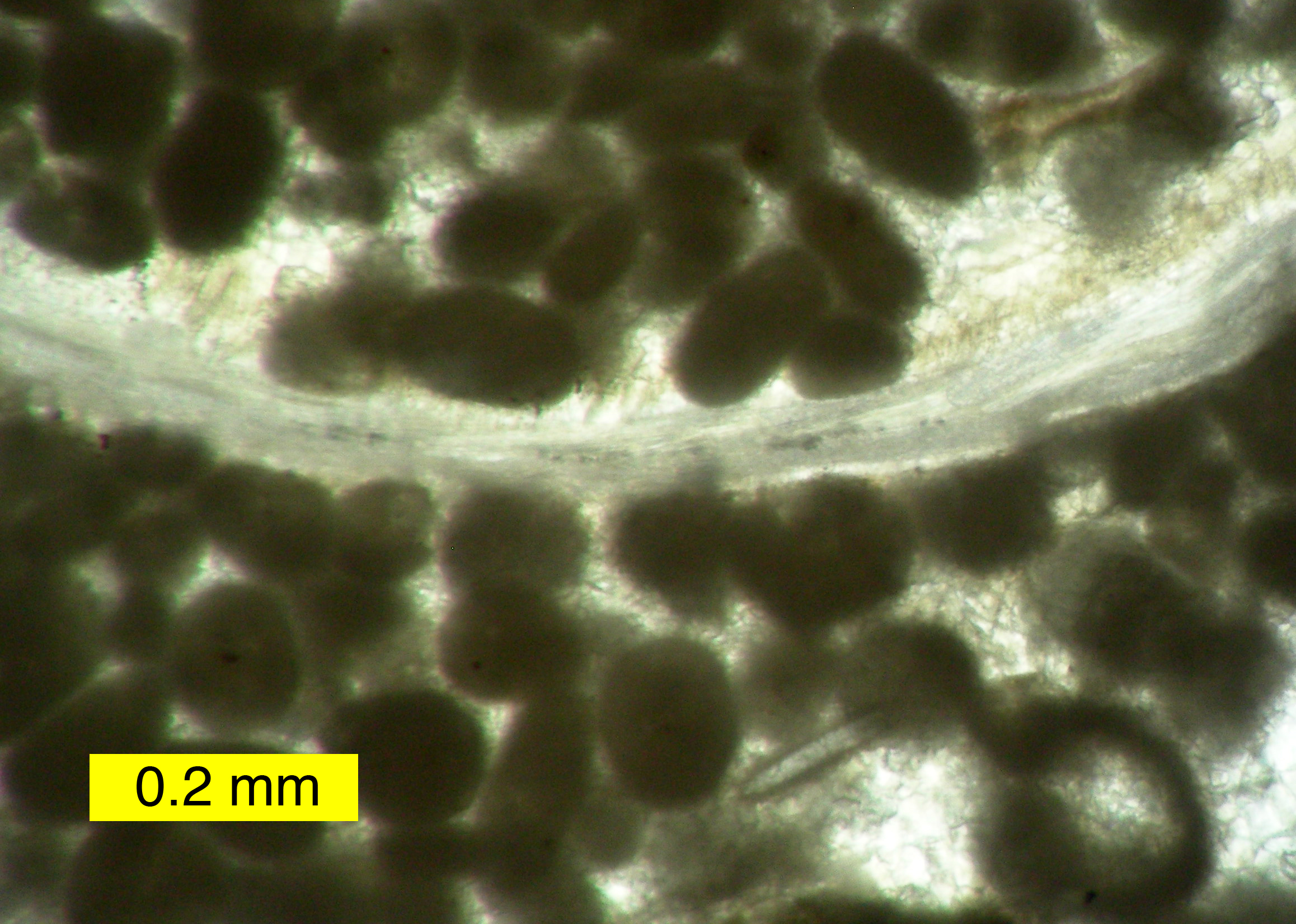
Carboniferous peloids

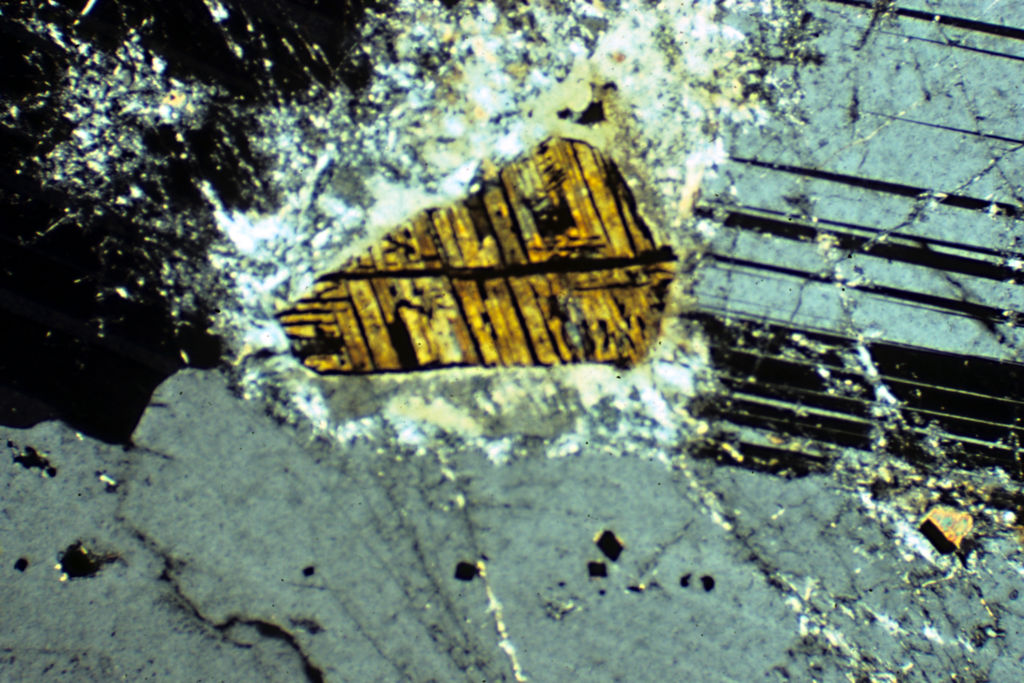
Anorthosite

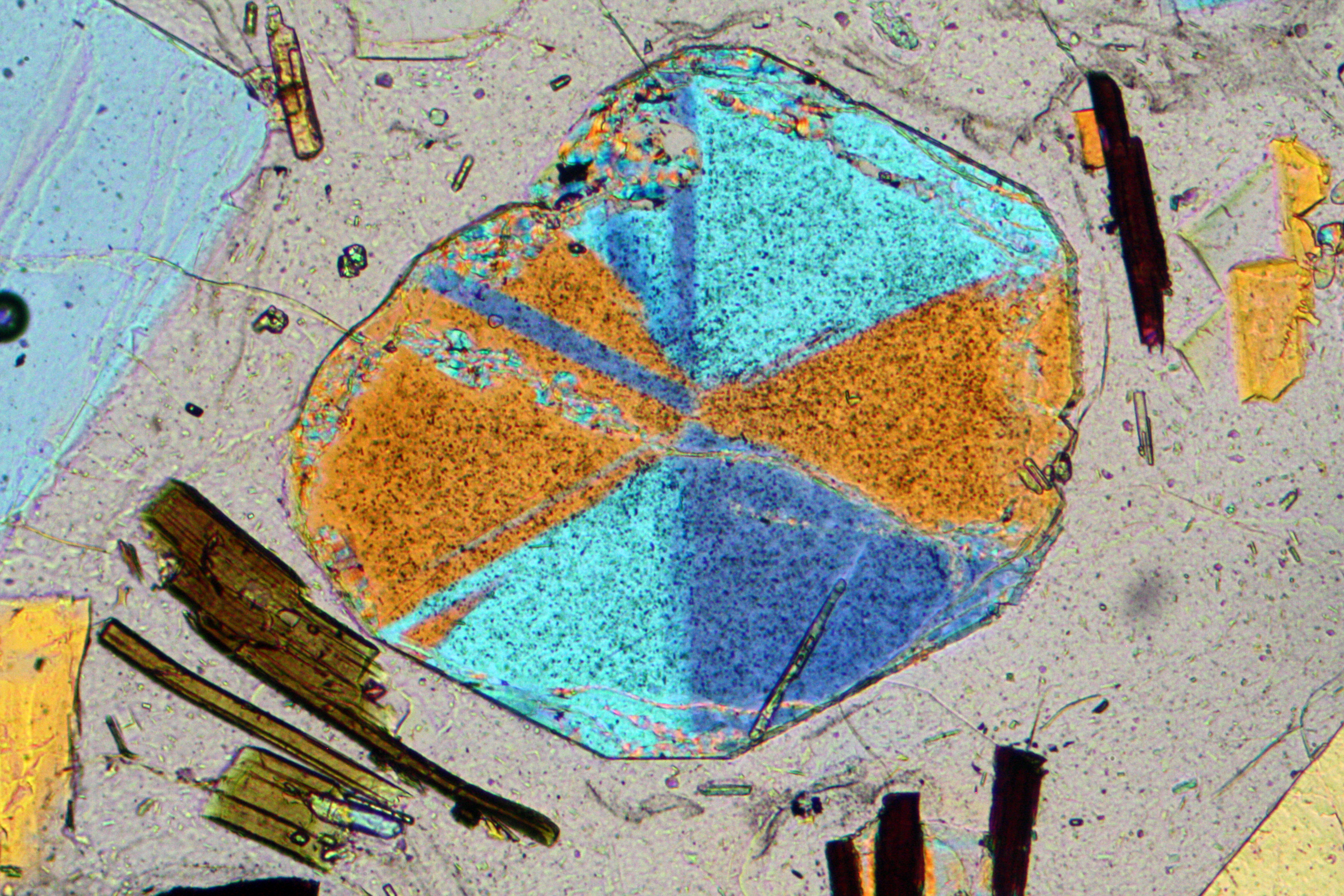
Cordierite

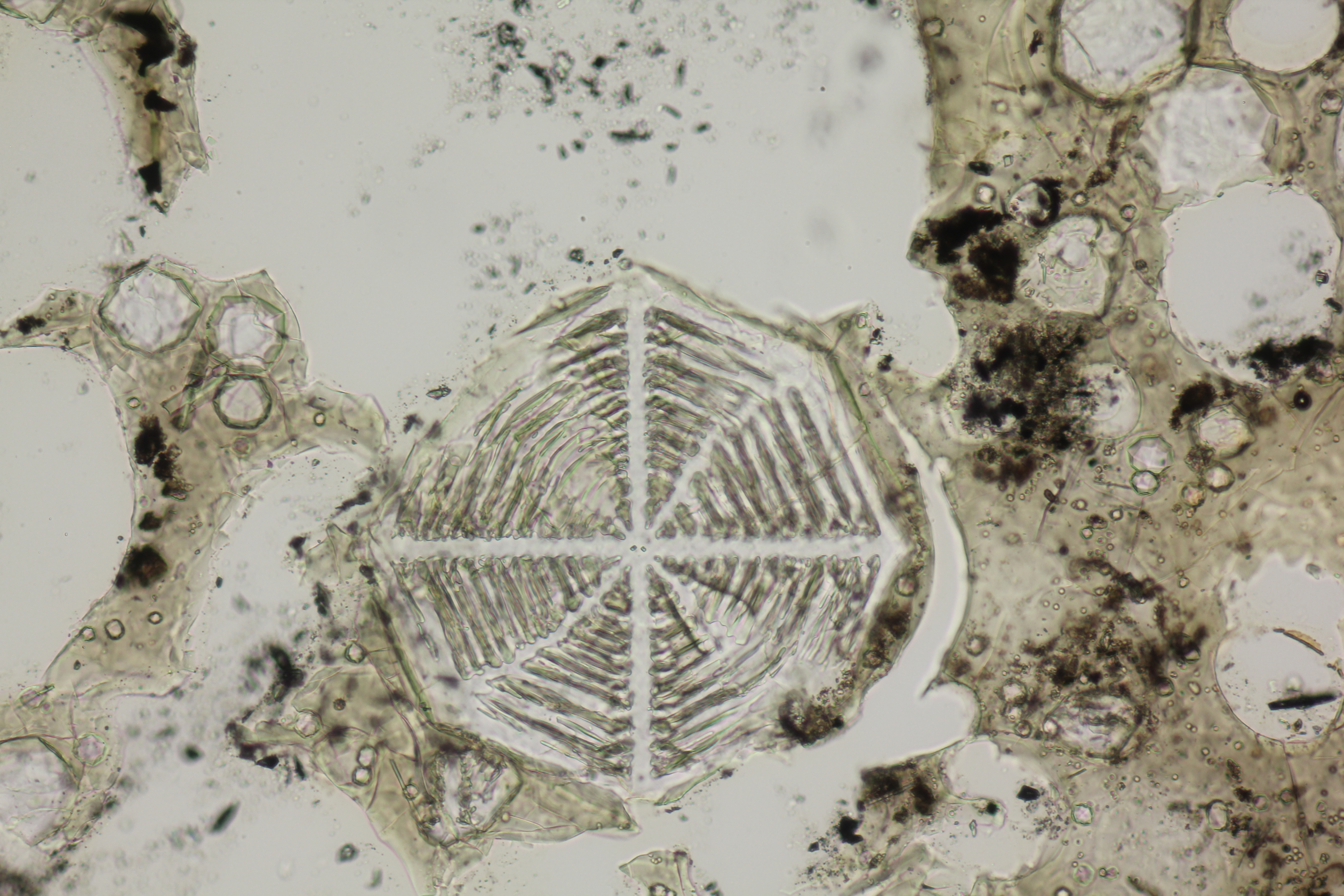
Leucite

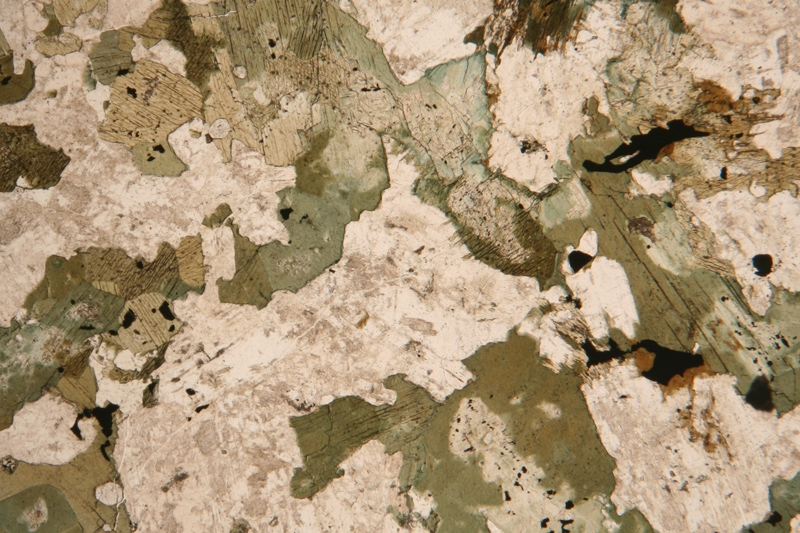
Diorite

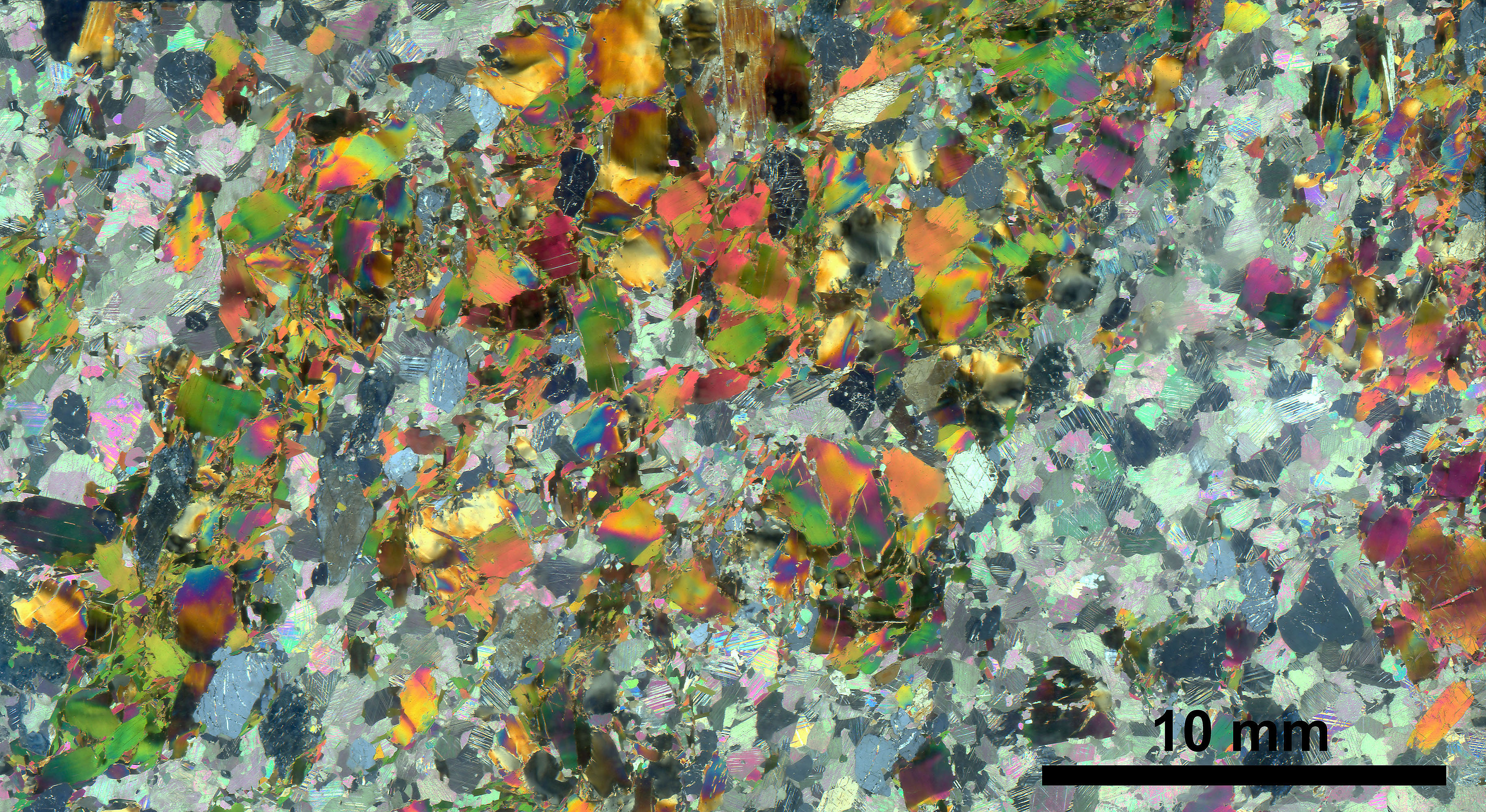
Apatite ore, Finland

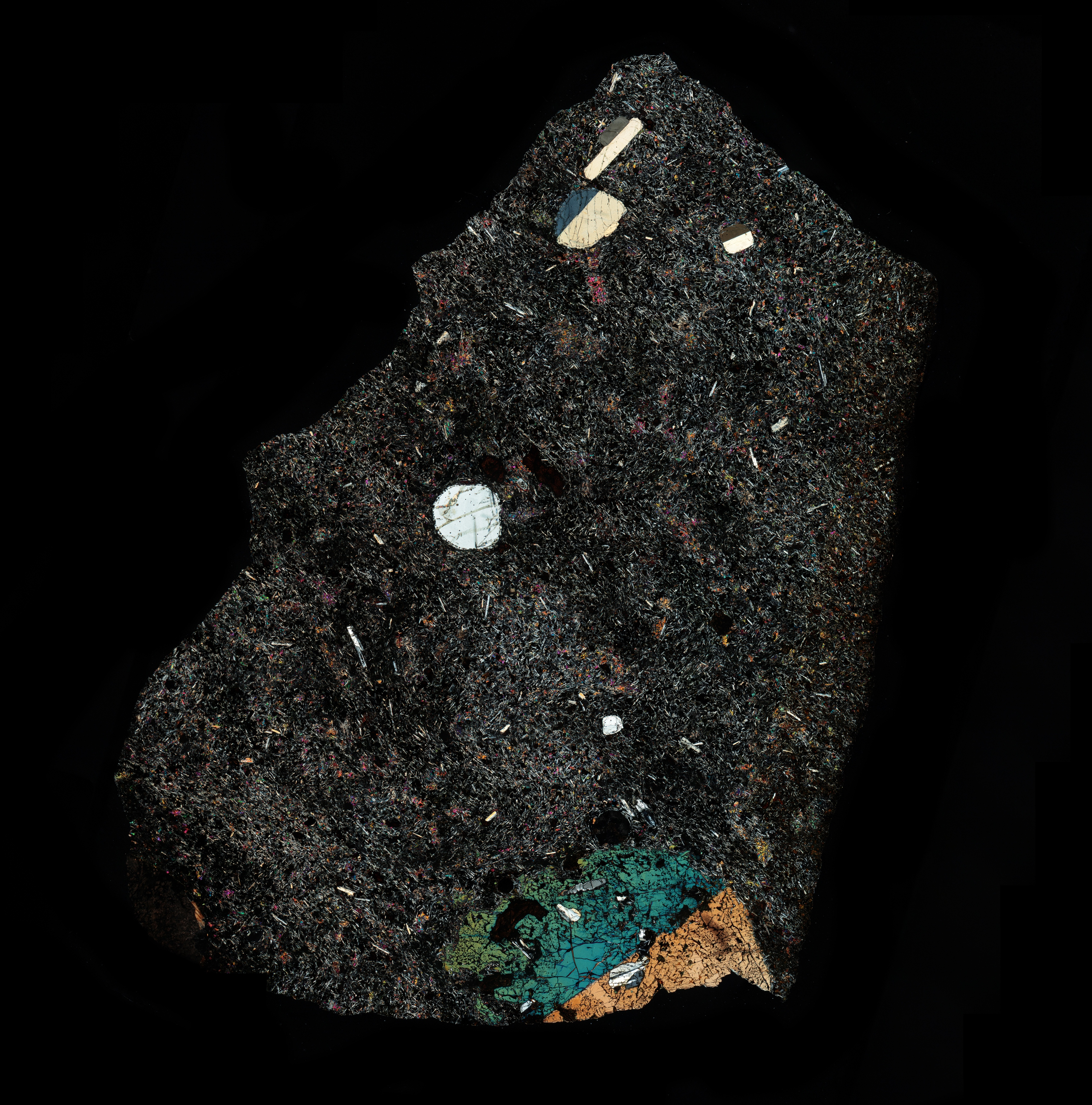
Basalt

== See also ==
- Ceramography: thin sections of ceramics
