= Extinction (optical mineralogy) =

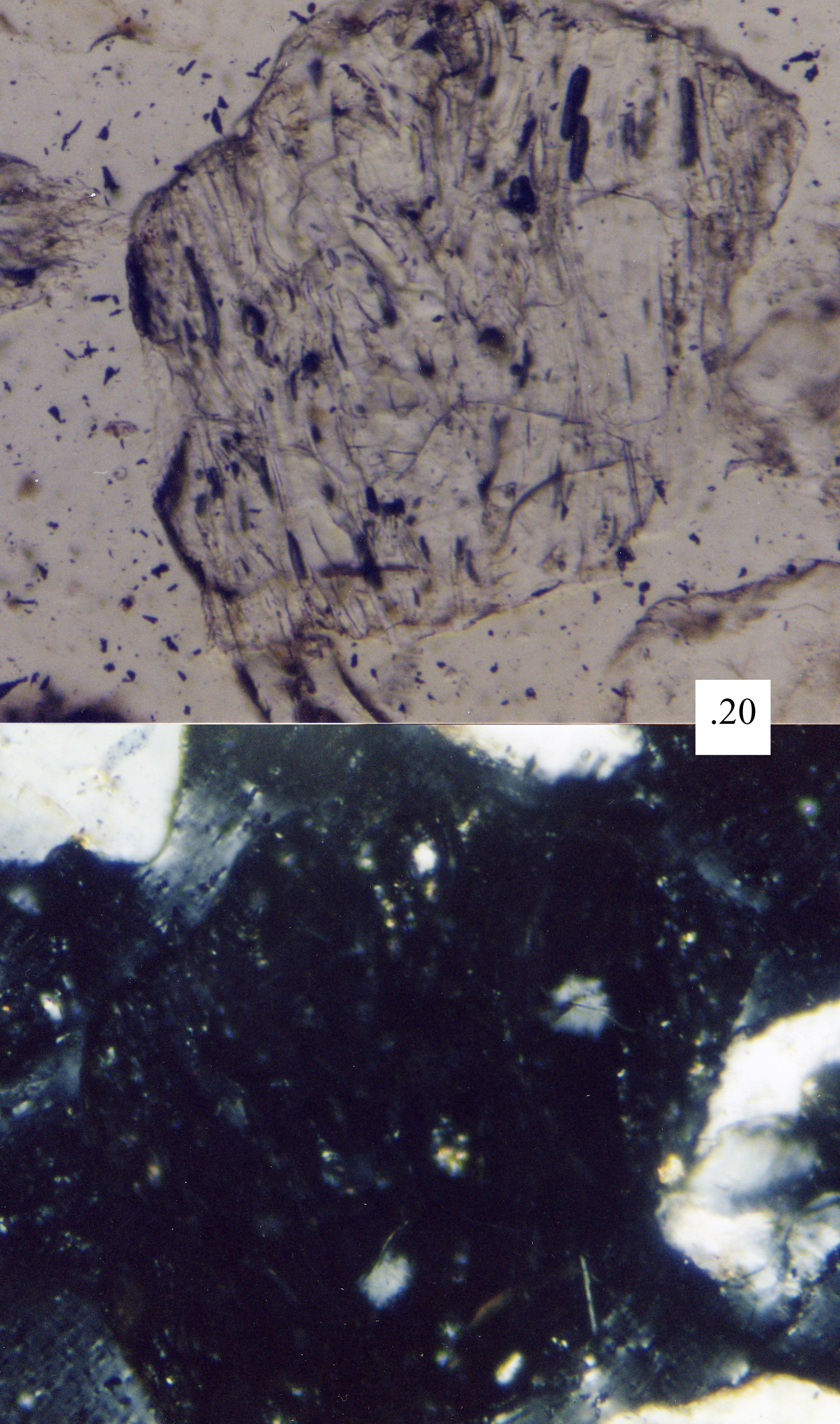
A sand grain of volcanic glass under the petrographic microscope. Its amorphous nature makes it go extinct in cross-polarized light (bottom frame), and thus does not have an extinction angle. Scale box in millimeters.

Undulose extinction in quartz.

Extinction is a term used in optical mineralogy and petrology, which describes when cross-polarized light dims, as viewed through a thin section of a mineral in a petrographic microscope. Isotropic minerals, opaque (metallic) minerals, and amorphous materials (glass) do not allow light transmission under cross-polarized light (i.e. constant extinction). Anisotropic minerals specifically will show one extinction for each 90 degrees of stage rotation.

The extinction angle is the measure between the cleavage direction or habit of a mineral and the extinction. To find this, simply line up the cleavage lines/long direction with one of the crosshairs in the microscope, and turn the mineral until the extinction occurs. The number of degrees the stage was rotated is the extinction angle, between 0-89 degrees. 90 degrees would be considered zero degrees, and is known as parallel extinction. Inclined extinction is a measured angle between 1-89 degrees. Minerals with two cleavages can have two extinction angles, with symmetrical extinction occurring when minerals have multiple angles that are the same. Minerals that have no cleavage or elongation can not have an extinction angle.

Minerals with undulose extinction, solid solution/zonation, or other factors (e.g. bird's eye extinction in mica) that may inhibit this measure and may be more difficult to use.
