= Élisabeth Jérémine =

Russian-French geologist (1879–1964)

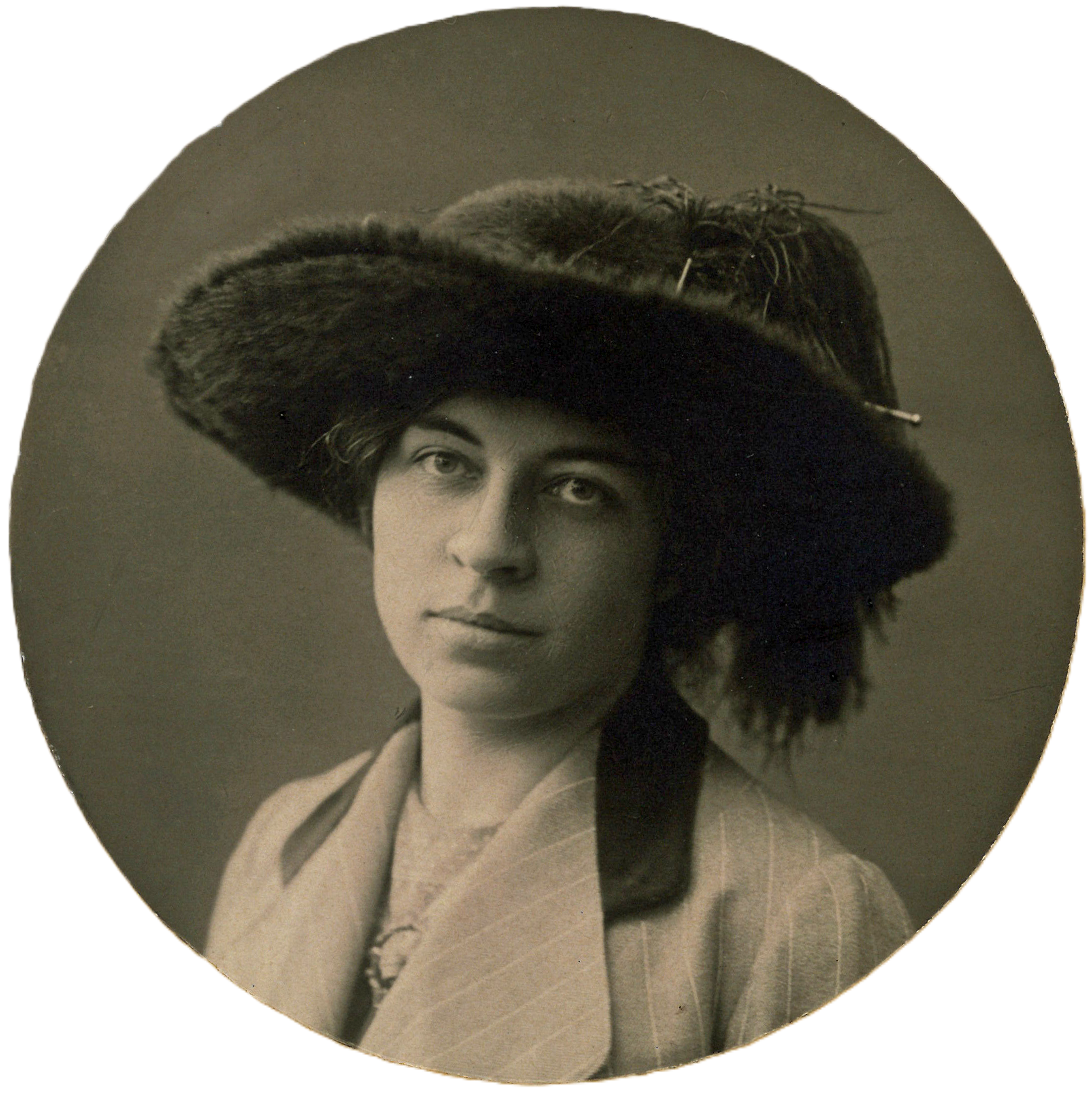
- Photograph of Jérémine as a young woman
- Born: Elizaveta Vladimirovna Chernyaeva; 28 October 1879; Kamenka, Moscow Governorate, Russia
- Died: 10 March 1964 (aged 84); Bad Zurzach, Switzerland
- Education: Bestuzhev Courses; Saint Petersburg State University; University of Geneva; University of Lausanne
- Occupations: Geologist; petrographer
- Employers: Bestuzhev Courses; Museum National d'Histoire Naturelle; École Nationale Supérieure de Géologie

Signature
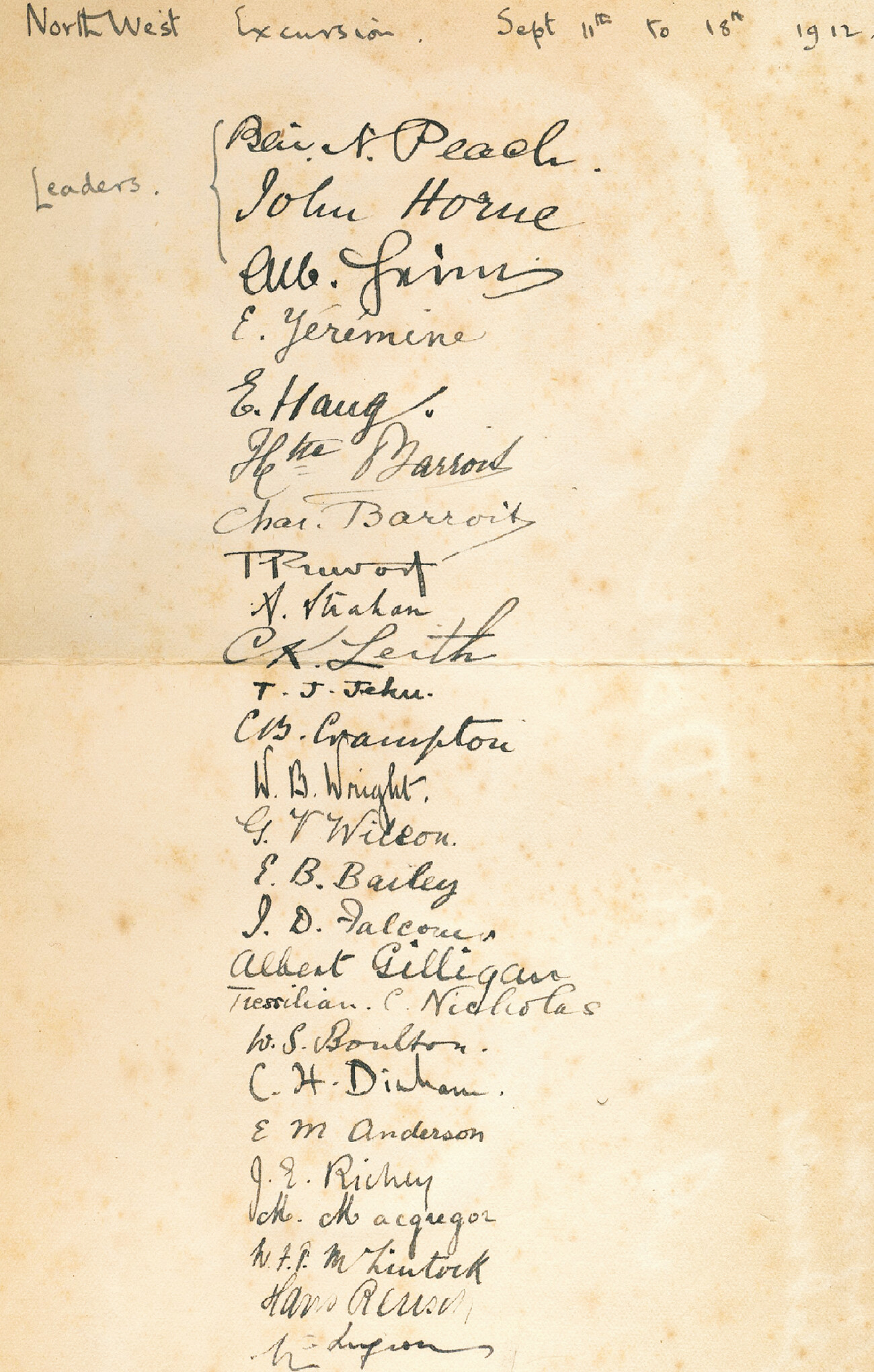

Élisabeth Jérémine (28 October 1879 – 10 March 1964), born Elizaveta Vladimirovna Chernyaeva (Russian: Елизавета Владимировна Черняева), was a Russian-French geologist and petrographer, specialising in rocks and meteorites. The Arête Jérémine, a large snow-covered ridge to the south of the Rallier du Baty Peninsula on the Kerguelen Islands, is named after her.

== Early life and education ==
Elizaveta Vladimirovna Chernyaeva was born on 28 October 1879 in Kamenka, in Moscow Governorate of the Russian Empire.

In 1904, she graduated in chemistry from the Department of Physics and Mathematics at the Bestuzhev Courses, the largest and most prominent women's higher education institution in Imperial Russia. She studied under geologist Professor Feodor Yulievich Levinson-Lessing. She was later employed as his assistant at the Department of Petrography at the Saint Petersburg State University.

== Career ==
Chernyaeva worked on igneous (magmatic) rocks, with Levinson-Lessing and she specialised in the use of the polarising optical microscope. She took part in the 8th session of the International Geological Congress in Paris, supported by her professor. From 1904 to 1913, she taught geology at her alma mater, the Bestuzhev Courses in Saint Petersburg. Her first scientific articles were published in 1905, in collaboration with Levinson-Lessing. His scientific connections played a decisive role in enabling Chernyaeva to travel to Europe and further her petrographic studies. She became known by the surname Jérémine in Switzerland and France, the pronunciation being a phonetic version of her Russian name.

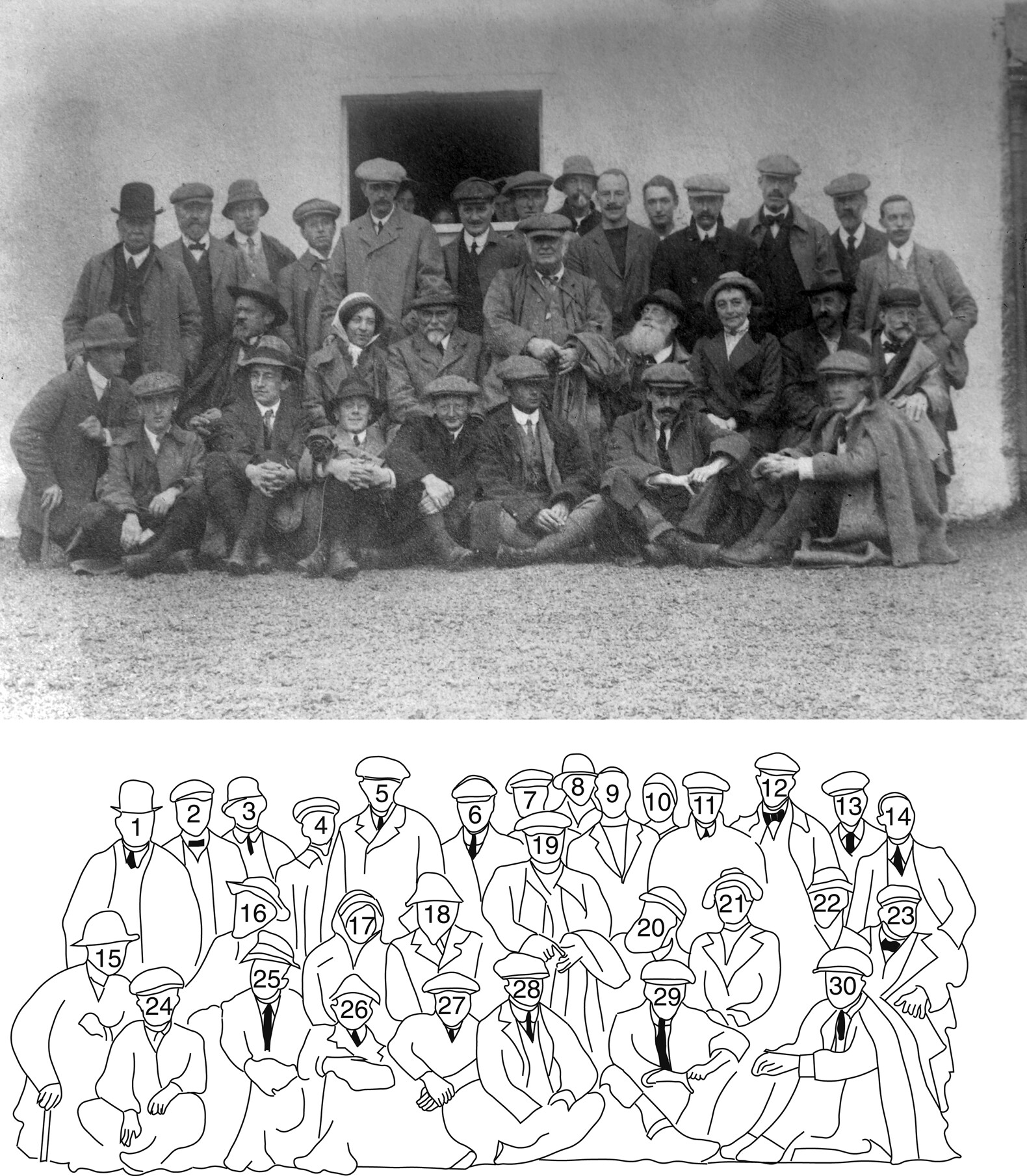
The 1912 British Science Association field excursion to Assynt outside the Inchnadamph Hotel, Jérémine to left in middle row with a scarf over her hat.

In 1905, Jérémine studied optical methods in petrography with Louis-Claude Duparc at the University of Geneva. Whilst researching for her doctorate, she worked with Swiss geologist Professor Maurice Lugeon at the University of Lausanne. In 1912, she was awarded a doctorate by the University of Lausanne for Les bassins fermés des Préalpes, studying the geology of the closed basins in the Swiss Alpine foothills. This research was published in a monograph she co-authored with Lugeon in 1911. In 1912, Jérémine was part of a British Science Association excursion to explore the geology of the Assynt area of Scotland, led by Ben Peach and John Horne, attended by many of the leading geologists of the day.

Jérémine returned to Russia after earning her doctorate. Following the October Revolution in 1917, she fled Russia for a time via Finland, using a false name and disguised as a governess. By 1920, she was in Paris listed as working at the Laboratoire de Mineralogie at the Museum National d’Histoire Naturelle (MNHN).

Jérémine worked at first as a preparatrice for Albert Michel-Lévy, introducing students to the study of rocks in thin sections under the microscope for the classes he taught at the Sorbonne. She supported Alfred Lacroix in his work on meteorites.

In 1921, Jérémine took part in the first expedition to the Kola Peninsula in the northwest of Russia. It was led by the Soviet geochemist Alexander Fersman at Moscow University. She worked as his assistant. She left Russia permanently after this and spent the rest of her career in France. She studied some of the rock samples from the expedition in Paris.

Jérémine joined the Sorbonne’s petrography laboratory as a laboratory assistant to Professor Albert Michel-Lévy. In 1922, she was a delegate at the 13th International Geological Congress in Brussels.

In 1926, Jérémine began working with the mineralogy laboratory at the Muséum national d'histoire naturelle in Paris, under Professor Alfred Lacroix. Between 1924 and 1932, she reclassified and tripled the size of the collection of endogenous rocks. In 1927, in collaboration with the mineralogist Jean Orcel, she played a significant role in the classification of meteorites. From 1928 onwards, she taught for around two months a year at the École Nationale Supérieure de Géologie in Nancy.

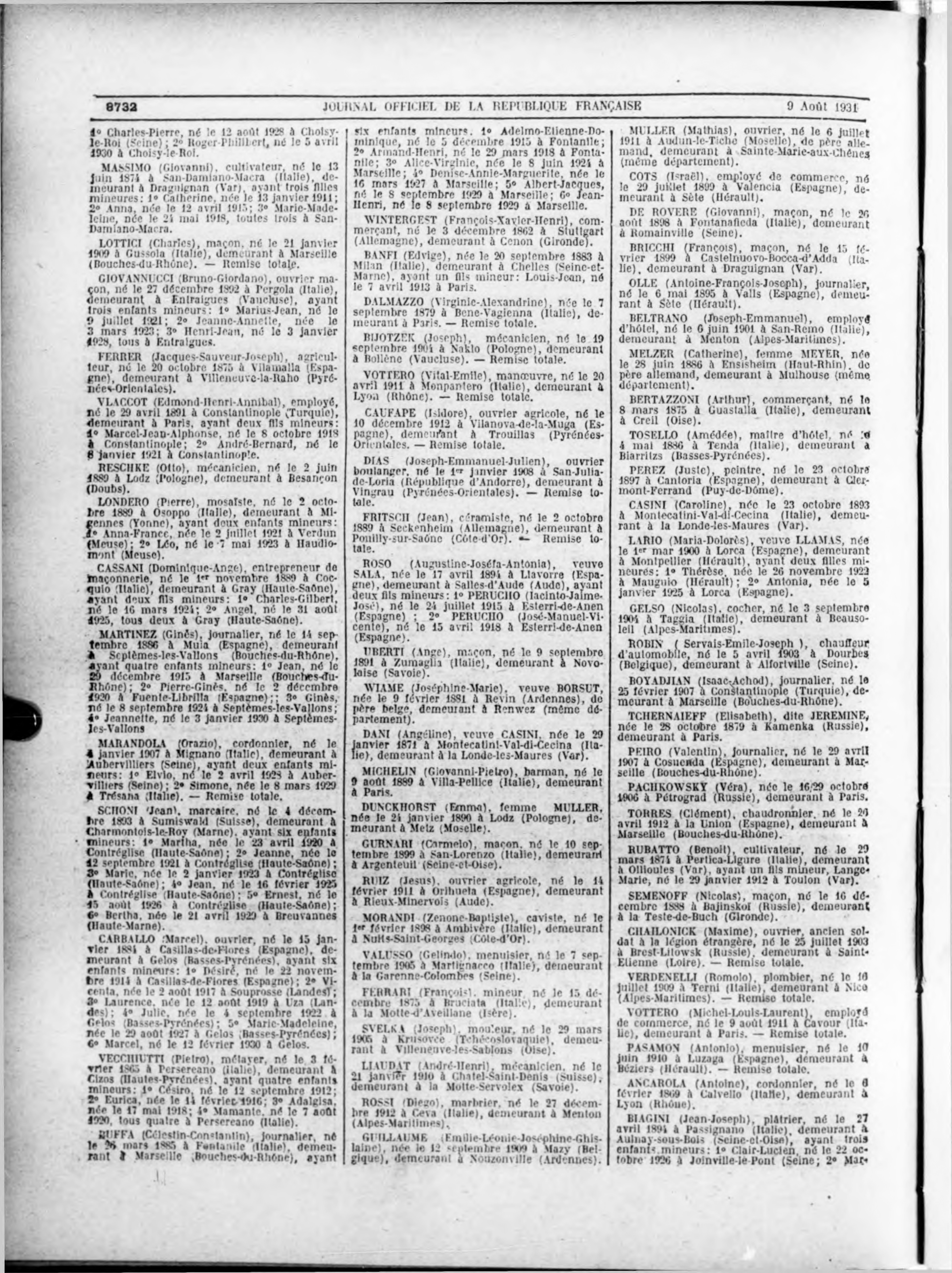
Notification of Élisabeth Jérémine's naturalisation

In the 1930s Jérémine was living in Jardin des Plantes area in the 5th arrondissement of Paris. In 1933, she was granted French nationality, and a grant from the Caisse nationale des sciences.

In 1937, Jérémine became head of the petrographic research department at the Muséum. In 1939, she was appointed a research fellow at the French National Centre for Scientific Research (CNRS). She worked in the laboratory and conducted research alongside European scientists including Émile Argand and Pierre Pruvost.

During the course of her career Jéremine published over 100 times on her work studying the petrography of sedimentary, metamorphic and volcanic rocks. In her later years, she conducted detailed studies into the composition of meteoritic materials. Her scientific work combined Russian and French approaches to geology. In 1948, she was a delegate, alongside Jean Orcel, to the Standing Committee on Meteorites at the International Union of Geological Sciences in London.

Jéremine led scientific expeditions to various regions of the world. She was respected amongst petrographers and trained numerous students. Jéremine was a member of the Société géologique de France from 1921, and the French Society of Mineralogy and Crystallography from 1928. She predicted a promising future for Alfred Wegener’s hypothesis of continental drift well before it was accepted by mainstream geology in the 1960s.

== Recognition ==
In 1932, Edgar Aubert de la Rüe named the Arête Jérémine, a large snow-covered ridge to the south of the Rallier du Baty Peninsula, on the Kerguelen Islands after Elisabeth Jérémine. This was in recognition of her being the first person to study the rocks brought back from there as part of a 1924 expedition.

In 1959, Jéremine was awarded the Prix Jérôme Ponti by the French Academy of Sciences.

== Death and legacy ==
Jéremine died aged 84 on 10 March 1964 in Bad Zürzach in Switzerland, where she is buried. Her name is carved on her gravestone in both Russian and French, at her request.

A collection of her correspondence between 1931–1964 with geologists Jean Orcel, Alfred Lacroix and Simonne Caillère is held by the Galerie de Minéralogie.

La Fondation vaudoise Jérémine, Lugeon et Rabot pour la géologie was established in 2003 by the merger of earlier foundations (the Vaud Foundation for Geology (founded by Jérémine), the Maurice Lugeon Foundation, and the Charles and Andrée Rabot Foundation) with the purpose of financially supporting the development of geological science at the University of Lausanne and at the Cantonal Museum of Geology (part of Naturéum) in Lausanne.
