= Michel-Lévy =

Michel-Lévy or Michel Lévy could refer to:

== People ==
- Michel Lévy (1821–1875), French publisher

== Surnames ==
- Albert Michel-Lévy (1877–1955), French geologist and mineralogist
- Auguste Michel-Lévy (1844–1911), French geologist
- Henri Michel-Lévy (1844–1914), French painter
- Mireille Christophe Michel-Lévy (1922–2026), French mineralogist
- Simone Michel-Lévy (1906–1945), French resistance worker

== See also ==
- Michel Lévy Frères, French publishing house
- Michel-Lévy chart mineral identification tool
