= Simonne Caillère =

French geologist (1905–1999)

- Born: 11 June 1905; Parigny
- Died: 10 September 1999 (aged 94); 14th arrondissement of Paris
- Education: Rennes University and then at the National Museum of Natural History in Paris
- Scientific career
- Fields: Geology

Simonne Caillère or Simone Caillière (11 June 1905 – 10 September 1999) was a French mineralogist and geologist. In 1956, she became the first full professor at the Mineralogy Laboratory of the National Museum of Natural History. She undertook extensive research on clays, publishing many papers on alumina and the transformation of minerals, particularly at low temperatures. This work has led to the development of numerous methods for treating minerals.

In 2026 it was proposed that her name should be added to the scientists and engineers whose names are on the Eiffel Tower.

== Early life and education ==
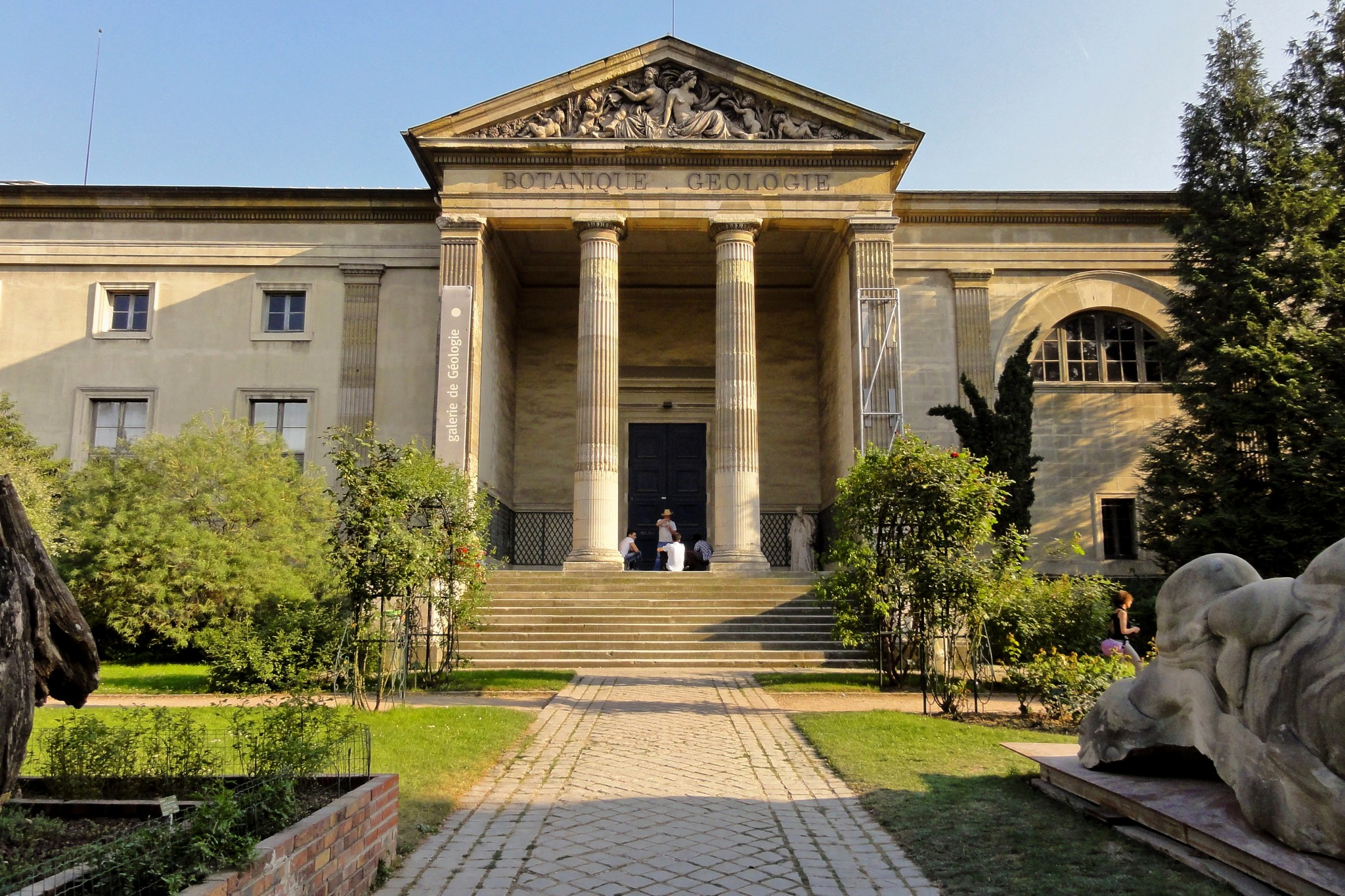
Gallery of Mineralogy and Geology, part of the part of the French National Museum of Natural History, in the Jardin des plantes, Paris

Simonne Anne-Marie Caillère was born on 11 June 1905 in Parigny in Normandy, to Zoe Jeanne Marie (née Bidard) and Charles-Louis Caillère, a justice of the pwace. She attended Rennes University where she graduated as a bachelor of science in physics in 1925. On the recommendation of the anatomist Raoul Anthony, she was awarded a scholarship in 1929 that allowed her to study for a PhD at the National Museum of Natural History in Paris under the direction of Alfred Lacroix.

In 1936, Caillère defended her doctoral thesis in physical sciences at the University of Paris and in the following year she succeeded Jean Orcel as assistant director in the mineralogy department after Orcel received a professorship.

During World War II, Caillère was involved in moving tonnes of minerals from the museum for safekeeping as the German army occupied Paris.

In 1956 she became the first professor at the Mineralogy Laboratory of the Muséum National d'Histoire Naturelle. Caillère had been a student of Jean Orcel and she named a mineral, made of nickel arsenate, Orcelite, after him in 1959.

Caillère was involved in over 200 publications. In 1963 she and Stéphane Hénin published their book on the mineralogy of clays (Minéralogie des argiles).

== Career and research ==
After graduating in science at the University of Rennes in 1925, Caillère received a grant to pursue a doctorate in 1929, which allowed her to work in the museum attached to the Mineralogy Department. After a second degree in physics in 1931, followed by a grant from the Caisse nationale des sciences (French science fund) for 1933 to 1937. During these years, she was able to work as a temporary assistant (préparatrice temporaire) in the University of Nancy's science faculty where she organised the first course in opaque minerals.

After defending a doctorate in physics in 1936, she was appointed deputy director of the museum's mineralogy department in 1937. Later that year, she became an auxiliary collaborator in the department responsible for the Geological Map of France, ultimately becoming its deputy head (adjointe) in 1950.

Simone Caillère's research in the field of mineralogy focused on the physicochemical properties of hydrated silicates, especially cryptocrystalline silicates, hydrates, hydrocarbonates, and carbonates. In the sphere of dynamic mineralogy, Caillère also investigated mineral assemblages igneous rocks and metallic ores. She is also known for her work on allevardites, anauxites, sepiolites and asbestos, the classification of which she played a key role in advancing. She also investigated assemblages in igneous and sedimentary rocks and the opaque constituents of metallic ores. Her experiments reproduced the processes leading to the alterations of minerals and the synthesis of clays at low temperatures. As a result, she was able to reconstruct the geochemical history of clays. Her work also contributed to documenting specific sheets of the Carte géologique de la France.

Caillère oversaw the first significant renovation and restoration of the Mineral Gallery building at the National History Museum, originally built in the 1830s. This involved both paintings and elements of the roof. The work and research on the latter renovation and restoration served as the basis for later repairs undertaken on the metal roofed spire of Chartres Cathedral.

With several hundred publications to her name, she is regarded as a specialist in alumina. Her research in experimental mineralogy on the transformation of minerals, particularly at low temperatures, has led to the development of numerous methods for treating minerals.

Throughout her career, Caillère travelled widely on missions to Italy (1937), Cornwall (1948), Morocco (1962), Yugoslavia (1963, 1964 and 1965), Algeria (1954), Mexico (1956), Sweden (1960) and Canada (1960). In addition to her permanent post, she also lectured at the École de Mines in 1945, at the Paris science faculty in 1956 and at the science faculty at the University of Montpellier in 1966.

In 1959, Simone Caillère, along with Jacques Avias and Jean Falgueirettes, discovered the mineral orcelite, which they named after Jean Orcel.

Caillère is also remembered for her contributions to various sections of the Geological Map of France and for serving as president of the French Clay Group (1963-1966).

== Awards ==
Simonne Caillère has been honoured with two significant awards, both bestowed by the French Academy of Sciences:

- In 1847, Caillère was awarded the Prix Victor Raulin which is presented by the French Academy of Sciences to researchers noted for their contributions to geology and paleontology.
- In 1964, from the French Academy of Sciences she received the Prix Millet-Ronssin together with Stéphane Hénin and George Millot.

== Death and legacy ==
Caillère co-founded the French Clay Group Le Groupe Français des Argiles. In 2020 the organisation create a biennial award to be called the Simonne Caillère prix in her memory. It is awarded to a young researcher.

A collection of her correspondence between 1931-1964 with geologists Jean Orcel, Alfred Lacroix and Élisabeth Jérémine is held by the Galerie de Minéralogie.

In 2026, Caillère was announced as one of 72 historical women in STEM whose names have been proposed to be added to the 72 men already celebrated on the Eiffel Tower. The plan was announced by the Mayor of Paris, Anne Hidalgo following the recommendations of a committee led by Isabelle Vauglin of Femmes et Sciences and Jean-François Martins, who represented the operating company which runs the Eiffel Tower.

== Selected publications ==
Siminne Caillère published widely with over 330 publications to her name. The following are considered significant:

- (1936) Contribution à l'étude des minéraux des serpentines
- (1972) In collaboration with Henri Besson and Stéphane Hénin, Recherches sur la synthèse des minéraux
- (1972) In collaboration with Henri Besson and Stéphane Hénin, Evolution du système Si Al Mg en présence de solutions concentrées de carbonate de potassium
- {1972) In collaboration with Henri Besson and Stéphane Hénin, Sur l'évolution de la montmorillonite en milieu alcalin potassique
- (1974) In collaboration with Henri Besson and Stéphane Hénin, Conditions de formation de divers hydrocarbonates voisins de l'hydrotalcite
- (1975) In collaboration with Stéphane Hénin, Fibrous Minerals
- (1975) In collaboration with Stéphane Hénin, Soil Components
- (1976) In collaboration with Stéphane Hénin, Physical and Chemical Properties of Phyllosilicates

Researchgate records 59 publications by Caillère.

Portail Persée records 87 publications by Caillère during the period of 1936-1985.
