= Jean Orcel =

French mineralogist (1896–1978)

Jean François Orcel
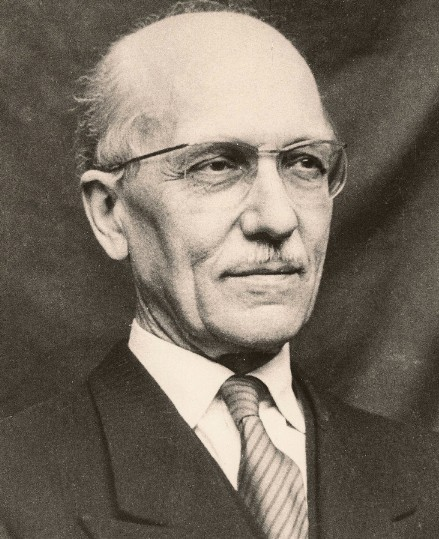
- Orcel in 1968
- Born: 3 May 1896; Paris
- Died: 27 March 1978 (aged 81)

Jean François Orcel (3 May 1896 – 27 March 1978) was a French mineralogist who contributed to the French nuclear energy programme following the discovery of Uranium vanadate deposits in Morocco. He worked as a mineralogist at the Muséum National d’Histoire Naturelle in Paris. He later specialised in the chemistry of meteorites.

== Early life and education ==
Jean Orcel was born in Paris where his father Edouard was a public works engineer. His mother Pauline Lesuisse was a teacher. After studies at the Lycée Henri IV he went on to study at Sorbonne University even though World War I broke out. Poor health disqualified him from conscription.

== Career ==
He became an assistant to Frédéric Wallerant in 1917 and in 1920 he joined the Muséum National d’Histoire Naturelle working under Alfred Lacroix. After Lacroix's retirement in 1937, Orcel succeeded him as professor of mineralogy.

Orcel studied phyllosilicates and chlorites, examining water of crystallisation in his doctoral work. He also went on field expeditions, collecting minerals and developing geological maps. He was involved in the acquisition of the mineral collection of Colonel Louis Vésigné (1870-1954). He examined the optical properties and polarisation of minerals including methods for dealing with opaque minerals.

During World War II he was involved in the French Resistance and in protecting the precious holdings of the museum. Following the war, he was involved in prospecting for uranium salts along with Louis Barrabé of which were found in Morocco. After retirement, he took an interest in meteorite chemistry. He also collaborated on work with the petrographer and meteorite researcher Elisabeth Jérémine (1879-1964).

== Global policy ==
He was one of the signatories of the agreement to convene a convention for drafting a world constitution. As a result, for the first time in human history, a World Constituent Assembly convened to draft and adopt the Constitution for the Federation of Earth.

== Recognition and legacy ==
A mineral of nickel arsenate was named as Orcelite by his student Simonne Caillère in 1959. Caillère later wrote Orcel's obituary following his death on 27 March 1978 at the age of 81.
