= Le Bicorne =

Mountain in the Kerguelen Islands

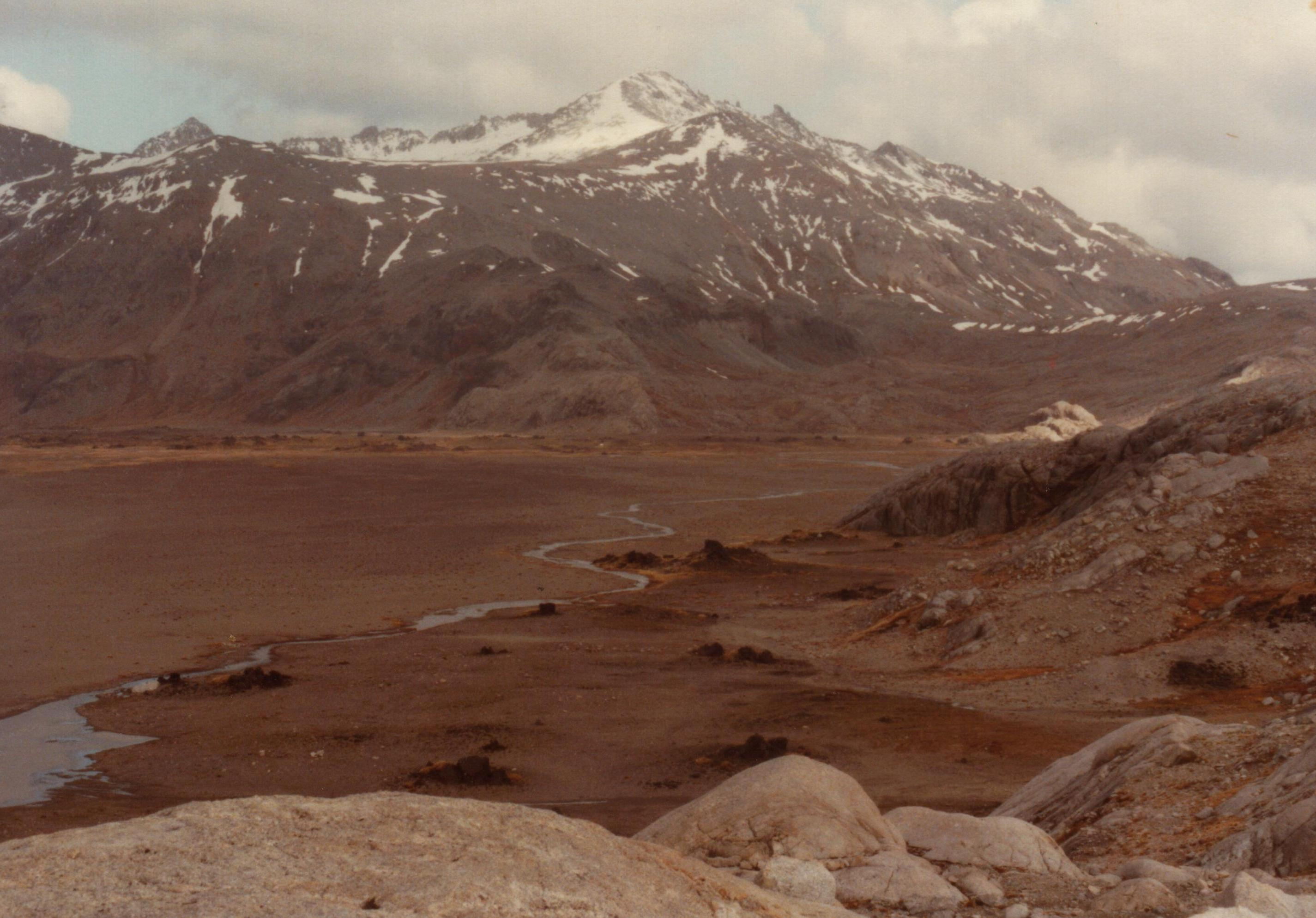
- Le Bicorne rising in the background.

Highest point
- Elevation: 1,202 m (3,944 ft)
- Prominence: 147 m (482 ft)
- Coordinates: 49°35′16″S 68°53′01″E

Geography
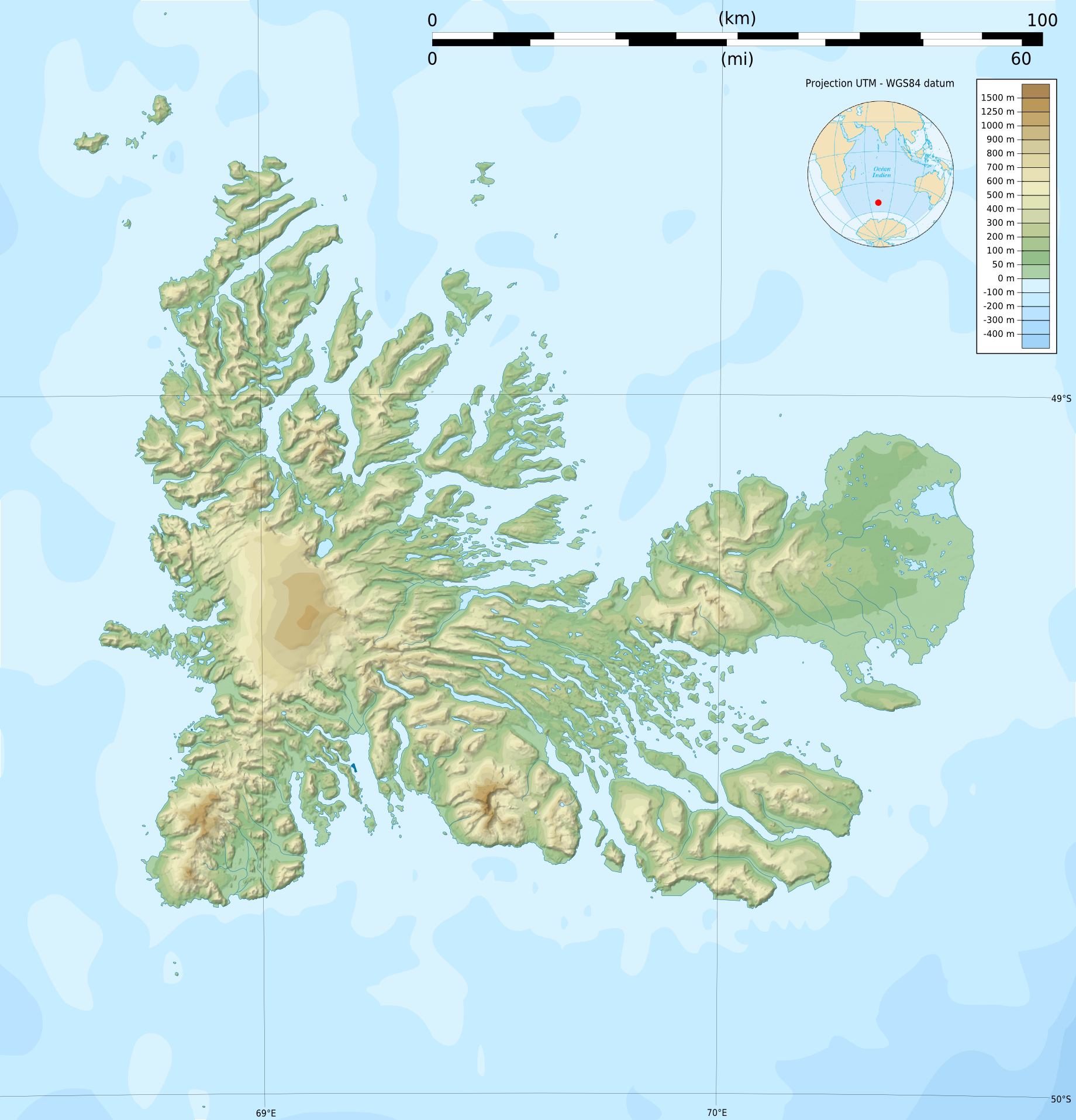
- Location within Kerguelen
- Location: Grande Terre, Kerguelen Islands, French Southern and Antarctic Lands

Climbing
- First ascent: Unknown

Le Bicorne is a mountain in the French Southern and Antarctic Lands. Located in the Rallier du Baty Peninsula, near the southwestern shore of Kerguelen, it rises to a height of 1,202 metres (3,944 ft) above sea level.

This mountain is the highest point on the peninsula and a prominent landmark. It was first named by French polar explorer Albert Bauer during an exploration of the Cook Glacier in 1961-1962. Bauer deemed that the two peaks atop the mountain resembled the bicorne hat worn by the members of the École polytechnique to which he belonged.

== See also ==
- Toponymy of the Kerguelen Islands
