= Rallier du Baty Peninsula =

Peninsula in Kerguelen Islands, Indian Ocean

Coordinates: 49°36′S 68°56′E

Topographic map of the Kerguelen Archipelago showing the peninsula in the south-west (lower left)

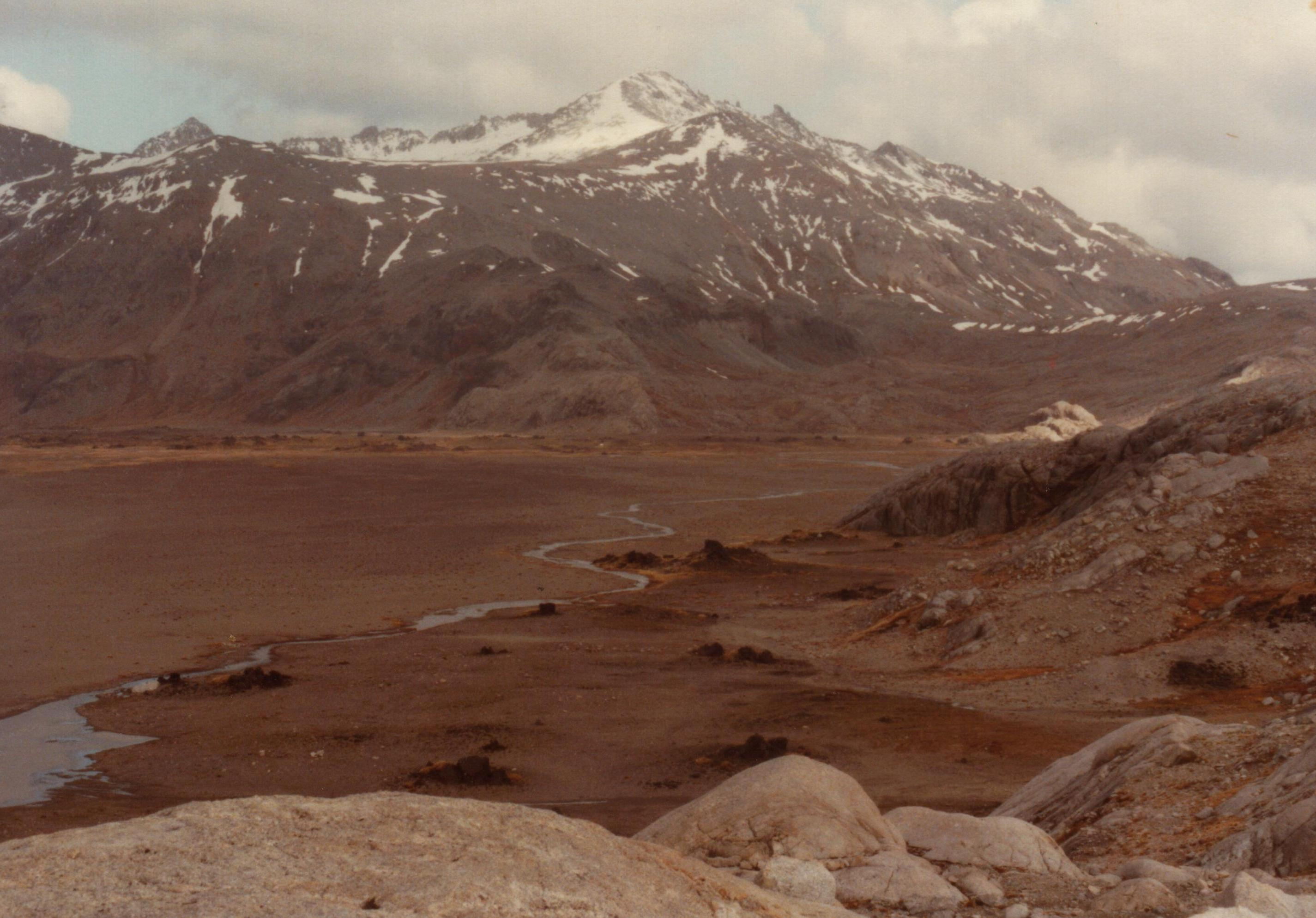
Peninsula landscape with Le Bicorne in the background

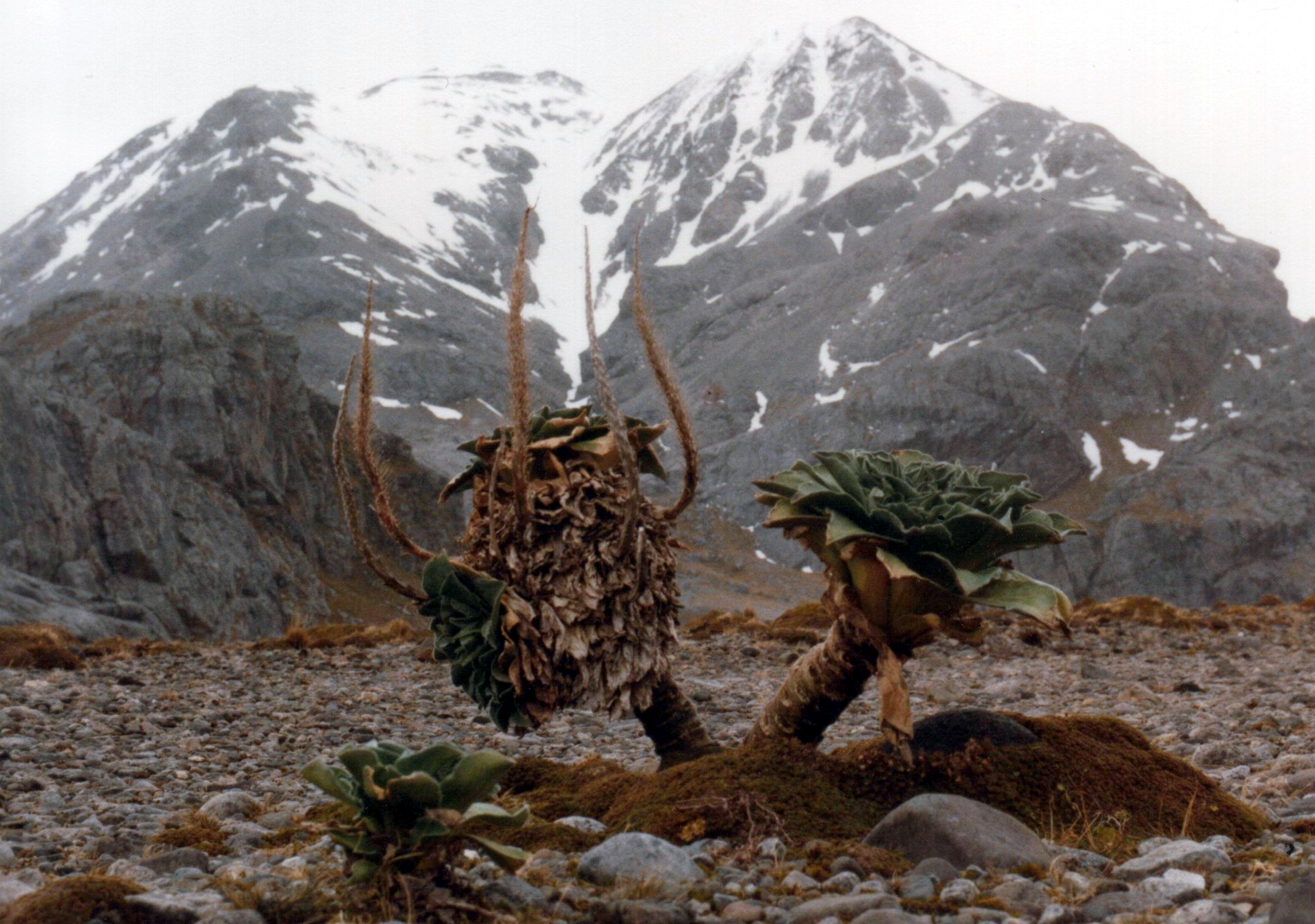
An old Kerguelen cabbage on the peninsula

The Rallier du Baty Peninsula (French: Péninsule Rallier du Baty or Presqu'ile Rallier du Baty) is a peninsula of Grande Terre, the main island of the subantarctic Kerguelen archipelago in the southern Indian Ocean. It occupies the south-western corner of the island, and is about 35 km long, extending from north to south, and 25 km across at its widest. The 1,202 m high Bicorne rises in the southern coast of the peninsula. It is named for Raymond Rallier du Baty, a French sailor who charted the archipelago in the early 20th century. The Îles Boynes, France's southernmost land apart from Adélie Land in Antarctica, lie 30 km south of the tip of the peninsula.

== Important Bird Area ==
The western half of the peninsula has been identified by BirdLife International as a 270 km^{2} Important Bird Area (IBA) because of its value as a breeding site for seabirds, with at least 31 species nesting there. The site is bordered on the north by the Cook Glacier and, to the south and east, by the Arête Jérémine and the main mountain ridge of the peninsula. Because it is isolated by rivers and glaciers, it is the only part of Grande Terre free from cats and rats, while rabbits are largely restricted to the northern part. The landscape is hilly and mostly lacks vegetation. The area shows geothermal activity, with vents emitting steam and gas. The ice capped mountains are cut by large, glaciated valleys. Human visitation is rare.

The IBA is particularly important for penguins, with 10,000 pairs of eastern rockhoppers, up to 3000 pairs of gentoos, 60,000 pairs of kings and over half a million pairs of macaronis. The colony of 750 pairs of wandering albatrosses is the largest in Kerguelen. It is the only known breeding site in the archipelago for southern giant petrels. It also holds very large populations of smaller petrels, especially white-headed petrels, slender-billed and Antarctic prions, and South Georgia and common diving petrels. Other birds breeding in the IBA include Eaton's pintails, Kerguelen shags, black-faced sheathbills and Kerguelen terns.

== Vegetation ==
The western half of the Péninsule Rallier du Baty has the endemic but rare Lyallia Cushion.

== Area management ==
Western Péninsule Rallier du Baty remains an area with limited access. Owing to its status as an 'Area restricted to scientific and technical research', visitors to the site are mostly scientists or researchers. The area could also be turned into a nature reserve in the future. Colonization of the site by mammalian species such as rats has gone up in recent years, since the glaciers that acted as barriers have been shrinking.
