= Feodor Yulievich Levinson-Lessing =

Russian geologist (1861–1939)

Franz Yulievich Levinson-Lessing
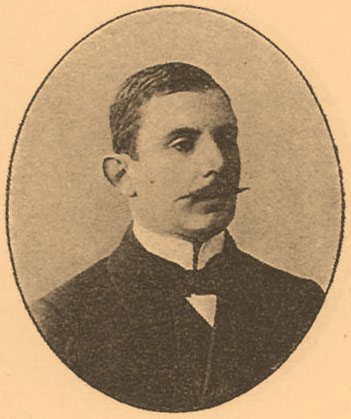
- Born: 9 March 1861; Saint Petersburg, Russia
- Died: 25 October 1939 (aged 78); Leningrad, Soviet Union
- Known for: Petrology
- Scientific career
- Fields: Geology, soil science
- Workplaces: Saint Petersburg University

Signature
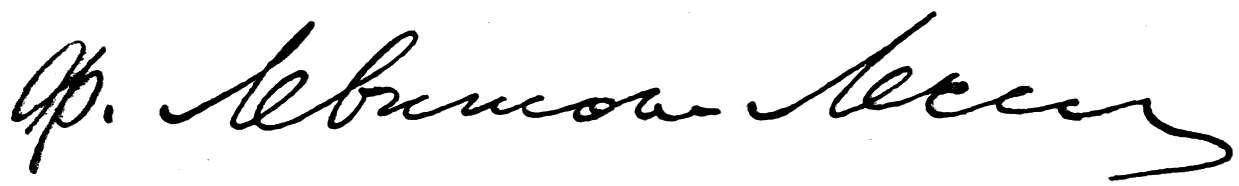

Franz Yulievich Levinson-Lessing (Russian: Фра́нц Юльевич Левинсо́н-Ле́ссинг; 9 March 1861 – 25 October 1939), also known as Theodor Levinson-Lessing, was a Russian geologist.

== Education ==
He graduated from the physico-mathematical faculty of the University of St. Petersburg in 1883, was placed in charge of the geological collection in 1886, and was appointed privat-docent at St. Petersburg University in 1889.

== Career ==
In 1892, he became professor, and the next year dean, of the physico-mathematical faculty of Yuryev University (now the University of Tartu). Aside from his work on petrography, he published also essays in other branches of geology, the result of scientific journeys throughout Russia.

Petrologist Élisabeth Jérémine was one of his students.

He died on 25 October 1939 in Leningrad.

== Legacy ==
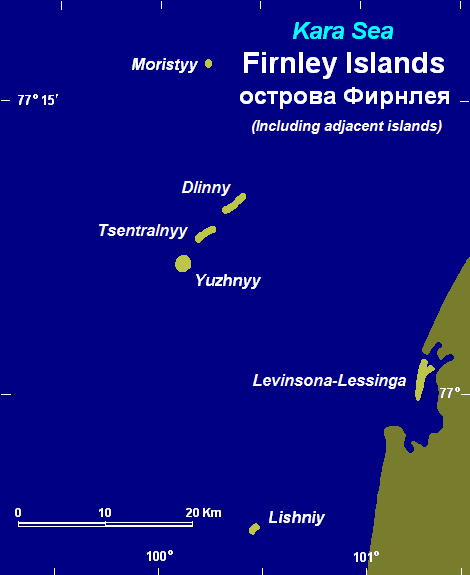
Map of Firnley Islands, Levinsona-Lessinga on right of image

An island in the Kara Sea was named after him: Levinson-Lessing Island (Ostrov Levinsona-Lessinga) at coordinates 77°01′N 101°17′E.

== Works ==
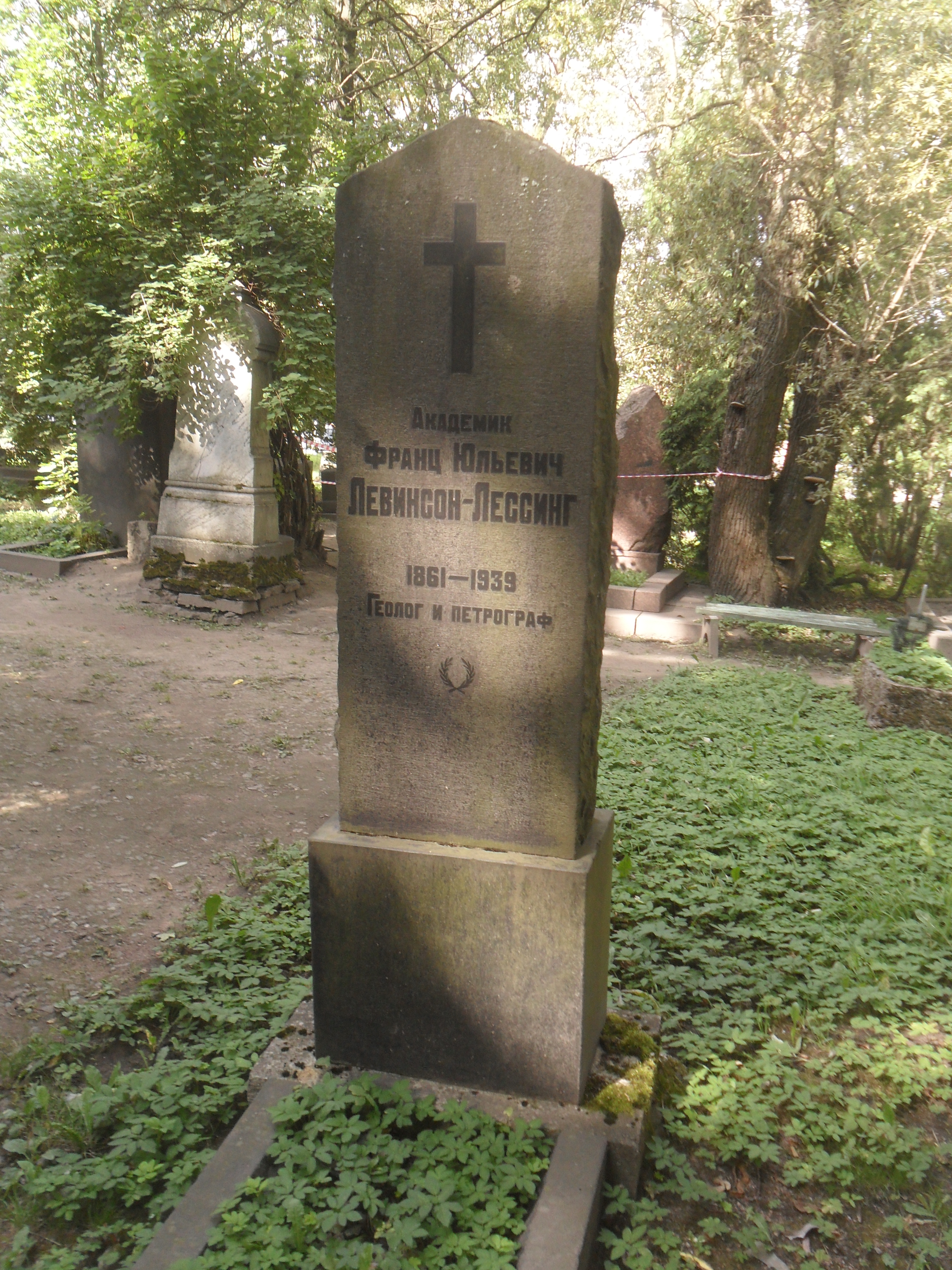
Grave.

In various periodicals more than thirty papers have been published by him, the most important being the following:

- "Olonetzkaya Diabazovaya Formatziya" (in "Trudy St. Peterburgskavo Obschestva Yestestvovyedeniya," xix.);
- "O Fosforitnom Chernozyome" (in "Trudy Volnoekonomicheskavo Obschestva," 1890);
- "O Nyekotorykh Khimicheskikh Tipakh Izvyerzhonykh Porod" (in "Vyestnik Yestestvoznaniya," 1890);
- "Geologicheskiya Izslyedovaniya v Guberlinskhikh Gorakh" (in "Zapiski Mineralnavo Obschestva");
- "Die Variolite von Yalguba" ("Tscherm. Mineral. Mitt." vi.);
- "Die Mikroskopische Beschaffenheit des Jordanalit" (ib. ix.);
- "Etudes sur le Porphirite de Deweboyu" (in "Bulletin de Société Belge de Géologie");
- "1 et 2 Notes sur la structure des roches éruptives" (ib.);
- "Note sur les taxites et les roches élastiques volcaniques" (ib.);
- "Les Ammonée de la Zone à Sporadoceras Munsteri" (ib.);
- "Petrographisches Lexicon" (2 parts, 1893–95);
- "Tablitzy dlya Mikroskopicheskikh Opredeleni Porodoobraznykh Mineralov."

The last was published in English by Gregory.

== Bibliography ==
- Entsiklopedicheski Slovar'

By: Herman Rosenthal, J. G. Lipman

== Sources ==
- "Левинсон-Лессинг, Франц Юльевич" . Brockhaus and Efron Encyclopedic Dictionary (in Russian). 1906.
