= Îles de Boynes =

Islets in the Kerguelen archipelago

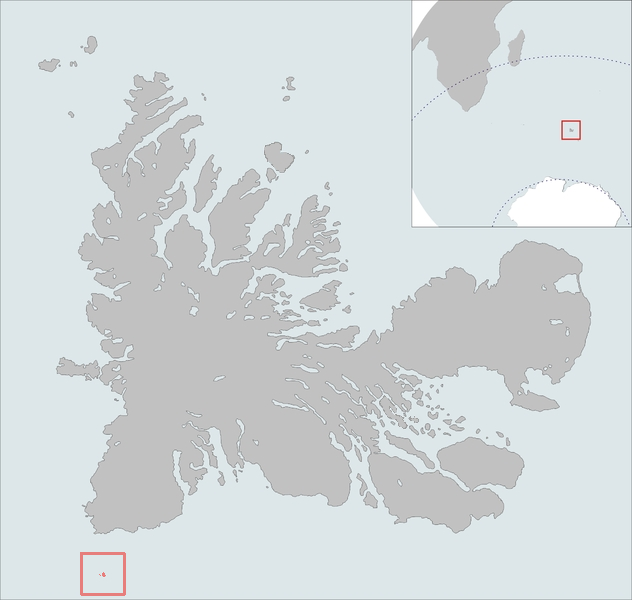
- Location of the Îles de Boynes within the Kerguelen Islands

Geography
- Location: Indian Ocean
- Coordinates: 50°01′S 68°52′E
- Archipelago: Îles Kerguelen
- Total islands: 4
- Major islands: Île de Boyne
- Area: 1 km^{2} (0.39 sq mi)
- Length: 0.3 km (0.19 mi)
- Width: 0.2 km (0.12 mi)
- Coastline: 0.2 km (0.12 mi)
- Highest elevation: 35 m (115 ft).
- Highest point: Île de Boyne

Administration
- France
- District: Îles Kerguelen

Demographics
- Demonym: Boyne
- Population: 0

The îles de Boynes (French pronunciation: [il də bwan]) or Boynes Islands, are four small rocky islands of the Kerguelen archipelago, lying some 30 kilometres (19 miles) south of Presqu'ile Rallier du Baty on the main island, just south of the 50 south parallel (50°01′S 68°52′E). They were discovered in 1772 by the first expedition of Yves-Joseph de Kerguelen-Trémarec. They were named after the marquis de Boynes, the French Secretary of the Navy of the period. Except for the controversial disputed claim to Adélie Land, Boynes Islands are the most southerly French land. There are no permanent residents on the islands.
