= Maucherite =

Nickel arsenide mineral

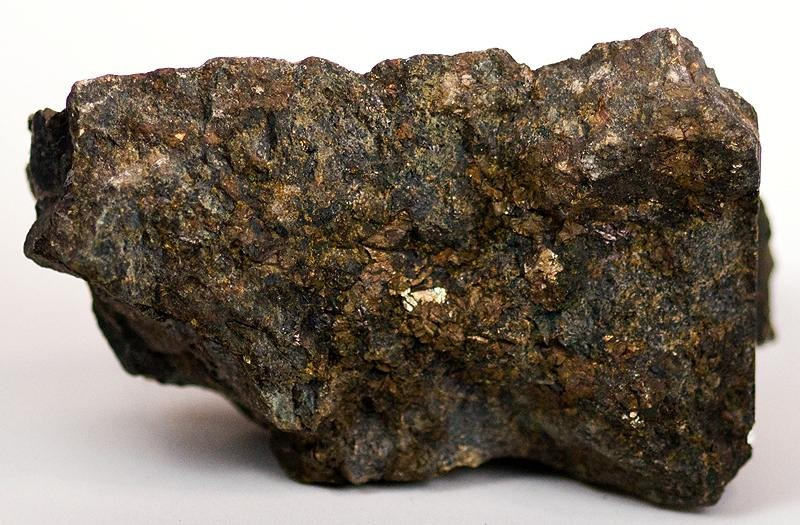
- Cubanite-maucherite-valleriite

General
- Category: Arsenide mineral
- Formula: Ni_{11}As_{8}
- IMA symbol: Muc
- Strunz classification: 2.AB.15
- Crystal system: Tetragonal
- Crystal class: Trapezohedral (422) (same H-M symbol)
- Space group: P4_{1}2_{1}2, P4_{3}2_{1}2

Identification
- Color: grey to reddish silver white
- Mohs scale hardness: 4.5–5.5
- Streak: grayish black
- Specific gravity: 6.9–7.3

Maucherite is a grey to reddish silver white nickel arsenide mineral. It crystallizes in the tetragonal crystal system. It occurs in hydrothermal veins alongside other nickel arsenide and sulfide minerals. It is metallic and opaque with a hardness of 5 and a specific gravity of 7.83. It is also known as placodine and Temiskamite. The unit cell is of symmetry group P4_{1}2_{1}2 or P4_{3}2_{1}2.

It has the chemical formula: Ni_{11}As_{8} and commonly contains copper, iron, cobalt, antimony, and sulfur as impurities.

It was discovered in 1913 in Eisleben, Germany and was named after Wilhelm Maucher (1879–1930), a German mineral collector.

== General references ==
- "Maucherite". www.mindat.org.
- Schumann, Walter (1991). Mineralien aus aller Welt. BLV Bestimmungsbuch (2 ed.). p. 223. ISBN 978-3-405-14003-8.
