= Auguste Michel-Lévy =

French geologist

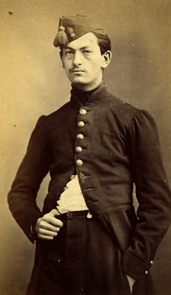
- Born: 7 August 1844; Paris, France
- Died: 27 September 1911 (aged 67)
- Family: Albert Michel-Lévy (son); Mireille Christophe Michel-Lévy (granddaughter)
- Scientific career
- Fields: Geology
- Workplaces: Geological Survey of France

Auguste Michel-Lévy (7 August 1844 – 27 September 1911) was a French geologist. He was born in Paris.

== Biography ==
He became inspector-general of mines, and director of the Geological Survey of France. He was distinguished for his researches on extrusive rocks and their microscopic structure and origins. He employed the polarizing microscope early on for the identification of minerals. In his many contributions to scientific journals he described the granulite group, and dealt with pegmatites, variolites, eurites, the ophites of the Pyrenees, the extinct volcanoes of Central France, gneisses, and crystalline schists.

He wrote "Structures et classification des roches éruptives" (1889), but his more elaborate studies were carried out with Ferdinand André Fouqué. Together they wrote on the artificial production of feldspar, nepheline and other minerals, and also of meteorites, and produced "Minéralogie micrographique: roches éruptives françaises" (1879) and "Synthése des minéraux et des roches" (1882). Levy also collaborated with Alfred Lacroix in "Les Minéraux des roches" (1888) and "Tableau des minéraux des roches" (1889).

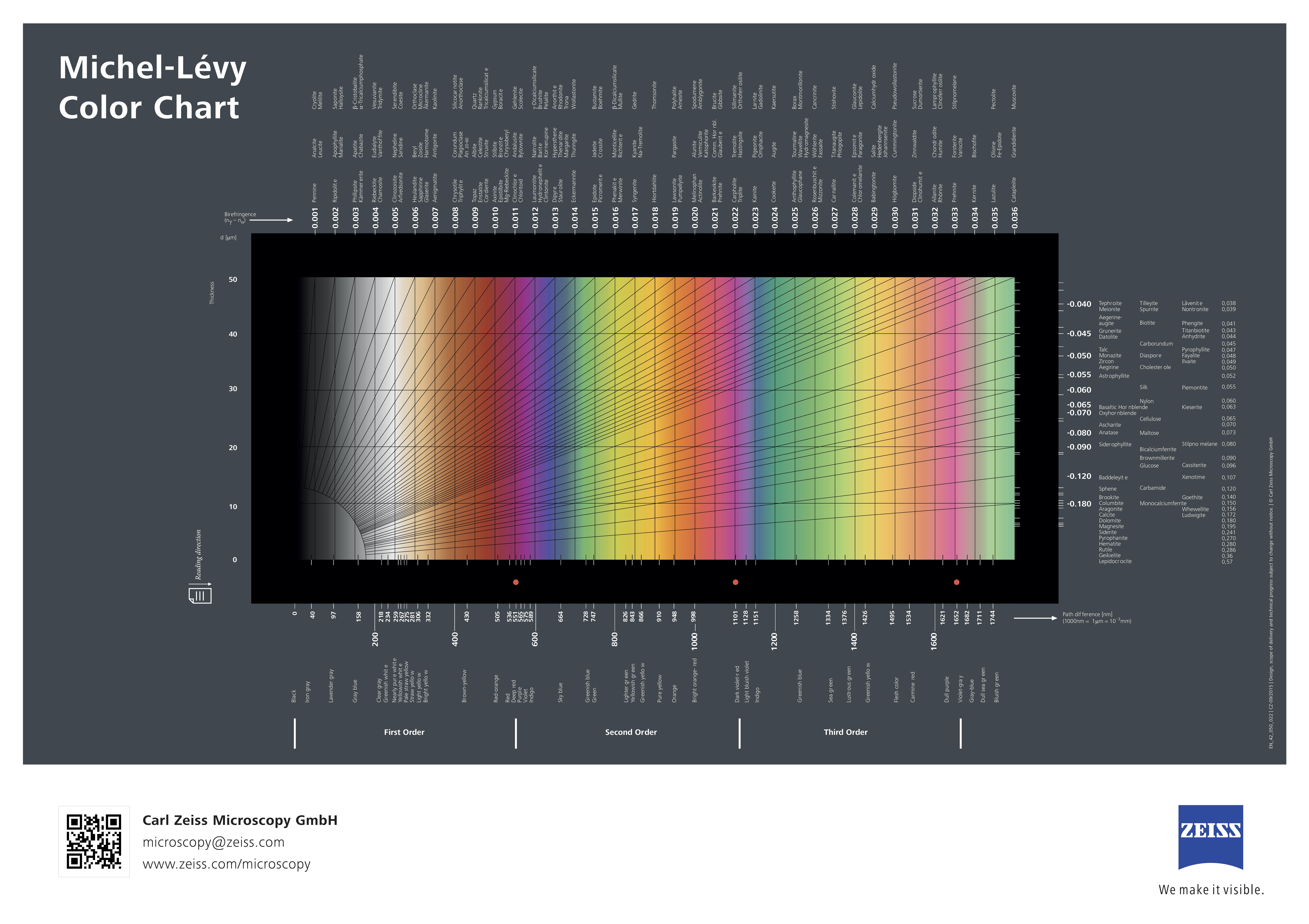
Michel-Lévy interference colour chart issued by Zeiss Microscopy

Michel-Lévy pioneered the use of birefringence to identify minerals in thin section with a petrographic microscope. He is widely known for the Michel-Lévy interference colour chart, which defines the interference colors from different orders of birefringence.

He also created classification schemes for igneous rocks which accounted for their mineralogy, texture, and composition, and showed that igneous rocks of different mineralogies could be formed from the same chemical composition, with different conditions of crystallization. He named "esterellite" to the blue porphyry of Estérel in 1896.
