= Pierre Pruvost =

French geologist (1890–1967)

Pierre Eugène Marie Joseph Pruvost (1 August 1890 – 5 June 1967) was a French geologist who worked as a professor of geology at the University of Lille. He was a specialist on the fossil fauna and flora of the coal basins of Europe.

== Life and work ==
Pruvost was born in Raismes in a family of physicians. He went to study medicine but shifted to geology and after receiving a degree in science from Lille in 1910 he went to work under Charles Barrois. He then began to examined the geology of northern France and looked at the fossils and stratigraphy of the coal mines of Nord-Pas-de-Calais for his doctorate, obtained only after World War I, in 1919. He then became a lecturer and in 1922, a professor of applied geology. He succeeded Charles Barrois at the University of Lille in 1926. He went to Sorbonne in 1950 and worked there until his death. Pruvost noted the idea that plant debris produced coal while the edges of coal basins included fish fossils and were associated with oil shale.

Pruvost guided numerous students and served as the president of the Geological Society of France in 1948 and in 1963. He was made officer of the Legion of Honor in 1949. In 1954 he was made a member of the Academy of Sciences in Paris. In 1963 he was elected an Honorary Fellow of the Royal Society of Edinburgh.
