= Mireille Christophe Michel-Lévy =

French mineralogist

- Mireille Christophe Michel-Lévy in 1978
- Born: September 7, 1922
- Died: September 26, 2026 (aged 104)
- Known for: Discovery of Calcium-aluminium-rich inclusions
- Father: Albert Michel-Lévy
- Relatives: Auguste Michel-Lévy (Grandfather)
- Scientific career
- Fields: Meteoritics; Mineralogy

Mireille Christophe Michel-Lévy (7 September 1922 - 26 September 2026), known as Madame Christophe, was a French mineralogist. She was a specialist in extraterrestrial matter. In 1968 she was the first person to describe Calcium-Aluminium rich inclusions (CAIs) in a meteorite. She recognised their unusually refractory nature, and inferred that they were a form of "primary silico-alumino-calcic condensate".

== Biography ==
Michel-Lévy was born into a family line of petrographers and mineralogists. Her father, Albert Michel-Lévy (1877–1955), was professor of petrography at the Sorbonne, and her grandfather was Auguste Michel-Lévy (1844–1911), who held the Chair of Geology at the Collège de France.

== Career ==
Michel-Lévy completed her studies in mineralogy in Paris. In 1946, she entered the mineralogical laboratory at the Sorbonne. In 1948, she was recruited as a CNRS research assistant in the mineralogy laboratory, and she remained there for the rest of her career. She worked in part on mineral synthesis, by experiment, and in part on the characterisation of the mineralogical makeup of meteorites. She was one of the first scientists to use the electron microprobe in meteorite studies. During her career she worked on many meteorites from the collections of the Muséum national d'Histoire naturelle in Paris, and described a number of minerals in meteorites for the first time, including the iron-poor pyroxene, fassaite, and the calcium aluminium oxide, grossite, CaAl_{4}O_{7}.

Michel-Lévy retired in the early 1990s, but continued to visit the mineralogy laboratories in the place Jussieu. She celebrated her 100th birthday in 2022, and died on 26 September 2026, at the age of 104.
