= Caisse nationale des sciences =

La Caisse nationale des sciences was a former French scientific research funding body.

== History ==
The Caisse nationale des sciences (CNS) was established by the French Finance Act of 16 April 1930. It was set up as a public body with financial autonomy and legal status, operating within the Ministry of Public Instruction. The Caisse nationale des lettres was established at the same time by the same act. The CNS had been inspired by the effectiveness of the Institut de biologie physico-chimique and its creation was championed by Nobel Prize winner, physicist Jean Perrin.

The CNS’ remit was to award grants to young researchers working in the sciences.

From 1933 onwards, the grants were awarded by the Conseil supérieur de la recherche scientifique (Higher Council for Scientific Research), which sat under the responsibilities of the Minister for National Education.

On 30 October 1935, the National Science Fund was merged with the Scientific Research Fund to form the National Fund for Scientific Research (la CNRS), which would merge in 1939 with the National Center for Applied Scientific Research (CNRSA) to form the Centre national de la recherche scientifique (le CNRS).
