= Albert Michel-Lévy =

French geologist and mineralogist

- Born: July 3, 1877
- Died: May 2, 1955 (aged 77)
- Education: Sorbonne University
- Father: Auguste Michel-Lévy
- Relatives: Mireille Christophe Michel-Lévy (daughter)
- Scientific career
- Fields: Petrology; Mineralogy
- Workplaces: Collège de France; University of Toulouse (1942-1945)
- Thesis: Les terrains primaire de Morvan et de la Loire (1908)

Albert Michel-Lévy (1877–1955) was a French geologist and mineralogist, and a pioneer of experimental mineralogy. He was a professor at the Sorbonne, and a member of the Institut de France and of the French Academy of Sciences. He was president of the Geological Society of France, the French Society of Mineralogy and Crystallography, and president of the International Association for Volcanology.

== Life and career ==
Michel-Lévy was born in Autun in July 1877 to Henriette Saint-Paul, and Auguste Michel-Lévy. His father was a geologist and petrologist, and director of the Geological Survey of France and Professor at the Collège de France.

Michel-Lévy initially trained in agronomy in Nancy, France, and in 1900 became a trainee ranger in the Water and Forestry Service. In 1901, he became a laboratory assistant to his father at the École pratique des hautes études in Paris, and began to study geology. He obtained a Bachelor of Science degree in 1904. In 1905, he was appointed laboratory assistant at the geology laboratory of the Collège de France, where his father had become director, in succession to Ferdinand Fouqué. Michel-Lévy defended his thesis in 1908 and in 1913 was appointed lecturer in petrography at the Sorbonne, filling a position vacated by Louis Gentil.

In 1914, with the outbreak of war, he joined the military as a captain in the Chasseurs à Pied light infantry. in 1915, he returned from the war as Chef de battalion. He suffered two serious wounds, and was decorated with multiple military honours, including chevalier of the Legion of Honour, the Croix de Guerre, commander of the Order of the British Empire, the Order of Leopold II (Belgium) and the Order of St Anna of Russia. He was elevated to officer of the Legion of Honour in 1920, and commander in 1946.

After the war, Michel-Lévy returned to the Sorbonne, where he continued his research into experimental mineralogy and petrology. In 1933, he was elected vice-president of the International Association for Volcanology. In 1934, he was elected president of the Geological Society of France. In 1936, Michel-Lévy became a full professor at the Sorbonne. That same year, he became president of the international association for volcanology, following the death of Konstantinos Ktenas. He held this post until 1948. He was twice elected president of the French Society of Mineralogy and Crystallography, in 1936 and 1946.

In 1941, the Vichy France government enacted the Second law on the status of Jews, and Michel-Lévy lost his position at the Sorbonne. With his family, Michel-Lévy took shelter from the Nazis in the French zone libre. In 1942, in light of his distinguished wartime service, he was allowed to take up a personal chair at the University of Toulouse. His son Roger joined the French Resistance, and was killed in February 1944. After the liberation of France, Michel-Levy returned to his position at the Sorbonne in 1945, and that same year was elected to the French Academy of Sciences. He retired in 1946, and died in Paris on May 2, 1955.

== Family ==
Michel-Lévy's father was the petrologist and mineralogist Auguste Michel-Lévy, who held the Chair of Geology at the Collège de France; his daughter Mireille Christophe Michel-Lévy also became a mineralogist at the Sorbonne.
