= Nickel arsenide =

Chemical compound of nickel and arsenic

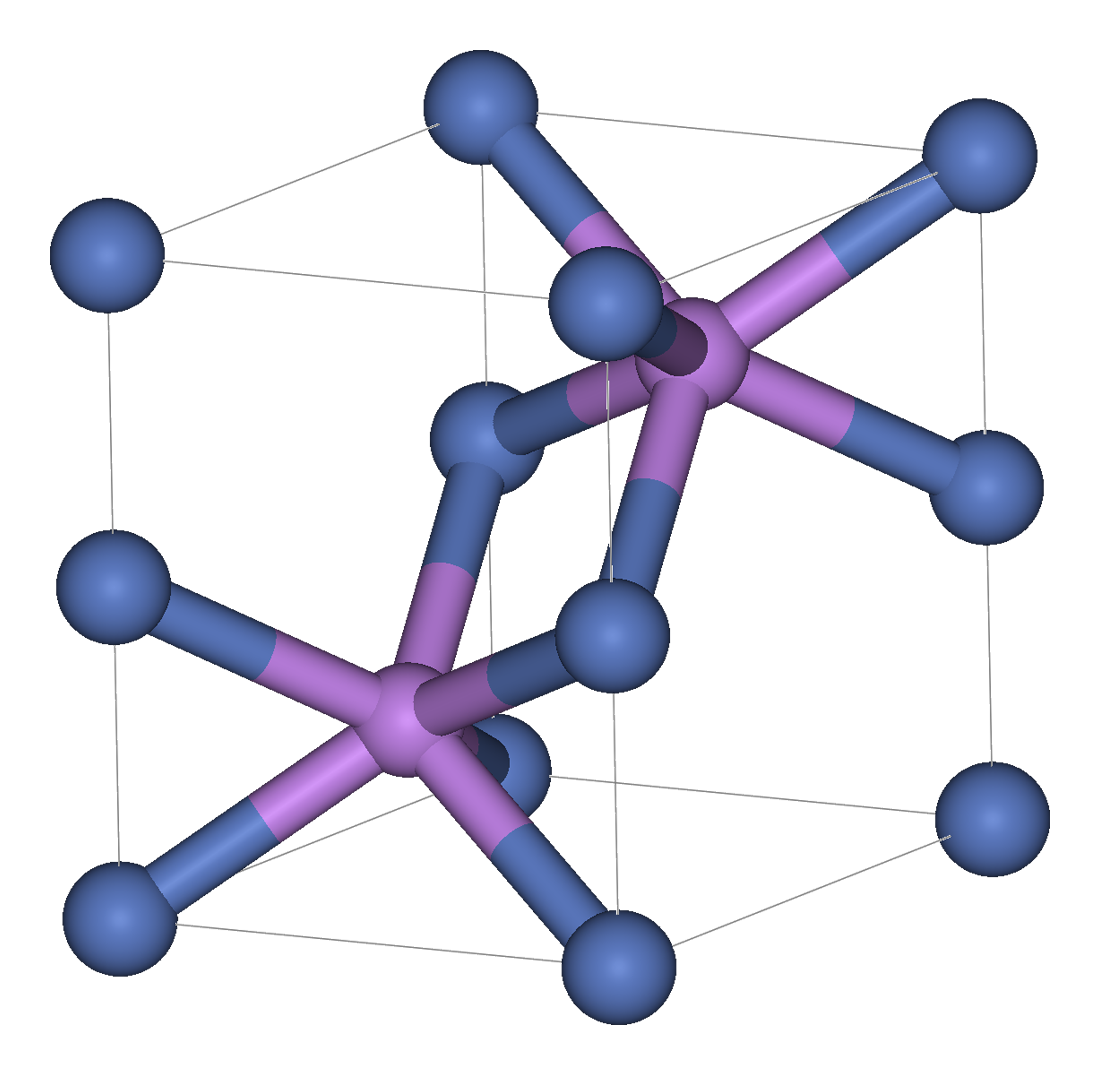

Identifiers
CAS Number	1303-13-5
3D model (JSmol)	Interactive image
ECHA InfoCard	100.043.776
EC Number	248-169-1
PubChem CID	62391 (NiAs); 138394006 (Ni_{5}As_{2})
UNII	2A4QIT3M17
CompTox Dashboard (EPA)	DTXSID9067273
- InChI: InChI=1S/As.Ni Key: UIFOTCALDQIDTI-UHFFFAOYSA-N
- SMILES: [Ni].[As]

Properties
Chemical formula	AsNi
Molar mass	133.6150 g·mol^{−1}
Appearance	red solid
Density	7.57 g/cm^{3}
Melting point	968 °C (1,774 °F; 1,241 K)
Solubility in water	nearly insoluble

Hazards
- GHS labelling
Pictograms	(GHS08: Health hazard) (GHS07: Exclamation mark) (GHS09: Environmental hazard)
Signal word	Danger
Hazard statements	H317, H350i, H372, H410
- Lethal dose or concentration (LD, LC)
LD_{50} (median dose)	6000 mg/kg (acute oral, rat)
- Except where otherwise noted, data are given for materials in their standard state (at 25 °C [77 °F], 100 kPa). Infobox references

Nickel arsenide refers to inorganic compounds composed of nickel and arsenic. Several forms exist including a monoarsenide with the chemical formula NiAs and another with the formula Ni_{5}As_{2}. It is highly toxic and a known carcinogen.

== Occurrence ==
Nickel arsenide occurs in the following minerals:

- Nickeline (NiAs)
- Orcelite (Ni_{5-x}As_{2}, x ~ 0.25)
- Maucherite (Ni_{11}As_{8})

== Preparation ==
Nickel arsenide can be prepared by direct combination of the elements:

Ni(s) + As(s) → NiAs(s)

== History ==
Nickel arsenide was one of the first compounds that revealed the toxicity of nickel. Damage to miners' lungs was documented by Georgius Agricola in the 16th century; "kupfer-nickel" ores in the Schneeberg mines contained red-colored NiAs mineral originally mistaken for copper ore, thus the German: kupfer (copper) in the name. The German: nickel (demon) name reflects the damage it did to the health of workers, in addition to the inability to extract any copper from this ore.
