= Ferdinand André Fouqué =

French geologist and petrologist

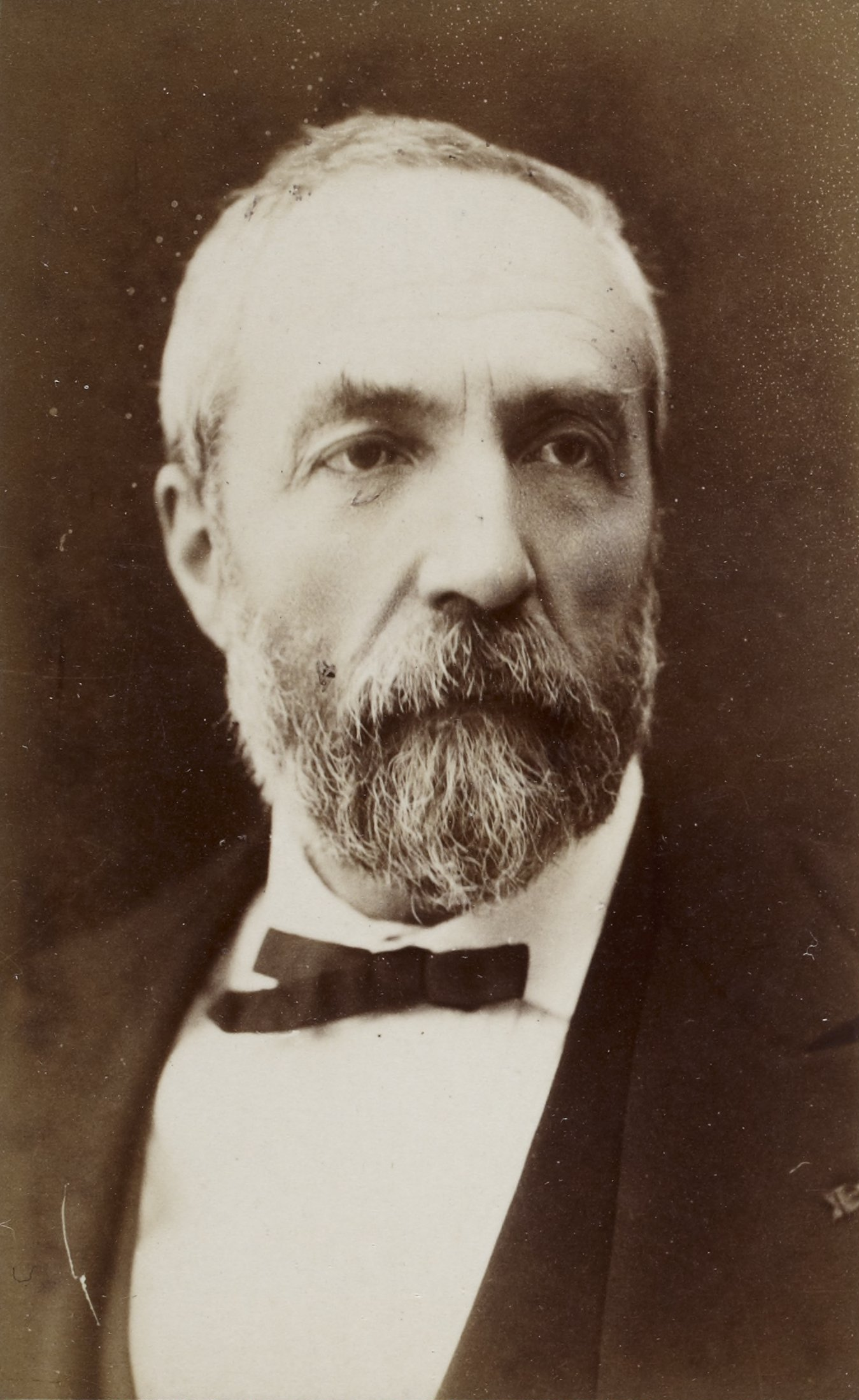
Ferdinand André Fouqué in 1883

Ferdinand André Fouqué (21 June 1828 – 7 March 1904) was a French geologist and petrologist.

He was born at Mortain, in the Manche département.

At the age of twenty-one he entered the École Normale Supérieure in Paris, and from 1853 to 1858 he held the appointment of keeper of the scientific collections. In 1877 he became professor of natural history in the chair of geology at the Collège de France, in Paris, succeeding Charles Sainte-Claire Deville. In 1881 Fouqué was elected a member of the Academy of Sciences.

As a stratigraphical geologist he rendered much assistance on the Geological Survey of France, but in the course of time he gave his special attention to the study of volcanic phenomena and earthquakes, to minerals and rocks; and he was the first to introduce modern petrographical methods into France. He also worked on volcanic gas analyses, using the methods of Robert Bunsen, notably on the island of Santorini (Greece). One prominent student of his was Alfred Lacroix, to whom Fouqué's daughter was married.

His studies of the eruptive rocks of Corsica, Santorini and elsewhere; his researches on the artificial reproduction of eruptive rocks, and his treatise on the optical characters of feldspars deserve special mention; but he was perhaps best known for the joint work which he carried on with his friend Auguste Michel-Lévy.

His chief publications were: Santorin et ses éruptions (1879), Minéralogie micrographique : roches éruptives françaises (1879) and Synthèse des minéraux et des roches (1882); the latter two works written in collaboration with Auguste Michel-Lévy. In 1885 he edited the report of the French commission that investigated the Andalusian earthquake of 25 December 1884.

Fouqué is also noteworthy for his archaeological excavations on the island of Santorini.

... Ten years before Schliemann, in 1862, during geological excavations, in that astonishing volcanic product, the island of Santorin (Thera), M. Fouqué had brought to light a whole civilisation buried beneath a layer of pumice-stone, due to an eruption supposed to have happened about 2000 B.C. He found walls coated with stucco, and painted with stripes and floral decorations, hand-made and wheel-made pottery; in short, the relics of a civilisation which we should now call 'Mycenæan.'

== Works ==
- Recherches sur les phénomènes chimiques qui se produisent dans les volcans, 1866.
- Rapport sur les phénomeńes chimiques de l'éruption de l'Etna en 1865, (1866).
- Les anciens volcans de la Grèce, 1867.
- Santorin et ses éruptions, 1879; later translated into English and published as: "Santorini and its eruptions", Baltimore : Johns Hopkins University Press, 1998.
- Minéralogie micrographique : roches éruptives françaises, 1879 (with Auguste Michel-Lévy).
- Synthèse des minéraux et des roches, 1882 (with Auguste Michel-Lévy).
- Les tremblements de terre, 1889.
- Contribution à l'étude des feldspaths des roches volcaniques, 1894.
