= Cook Ice Cap =

Glacier in France

- Calotte Glaciaire Cook
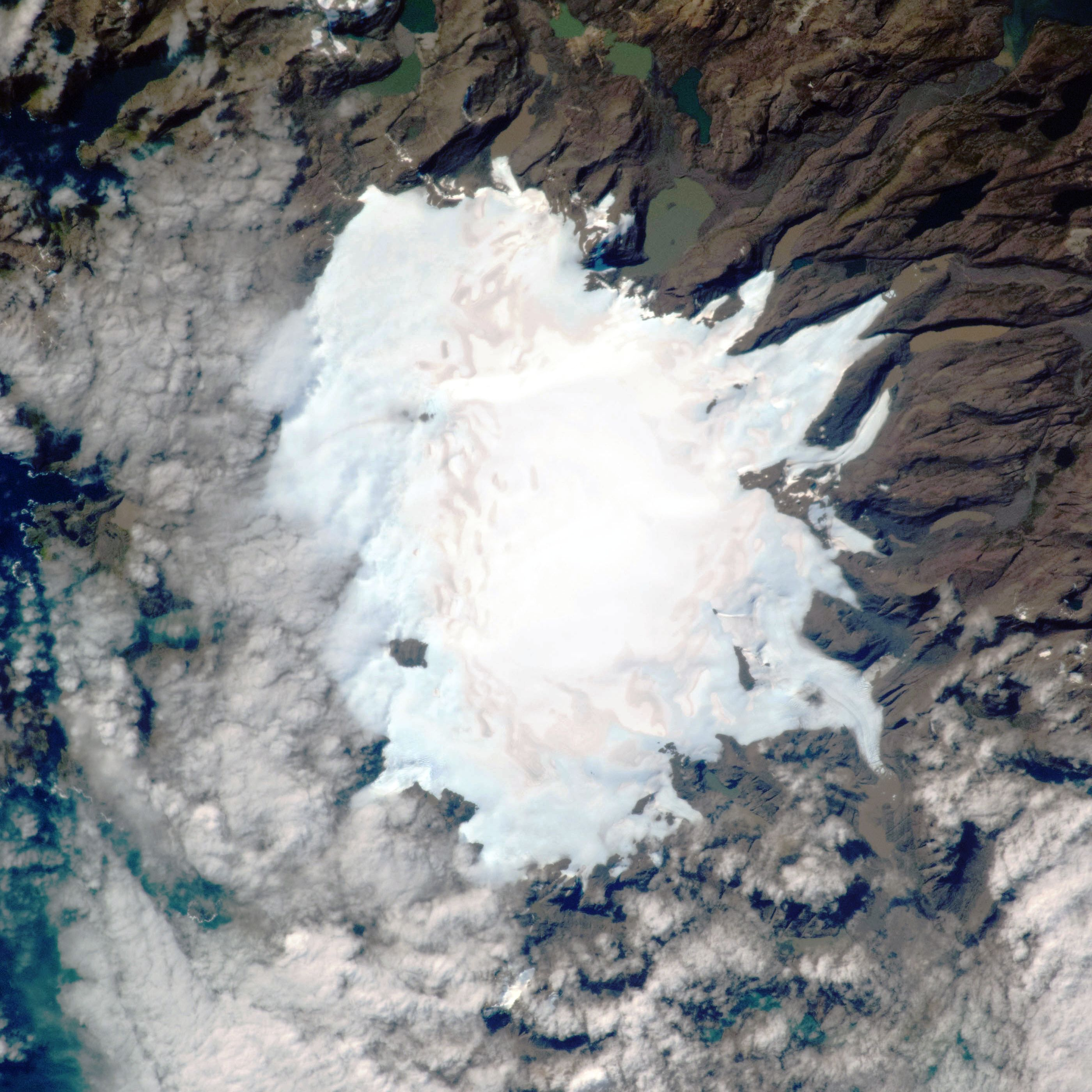
- Aerial view of the ice cap.

- Location within Indian Ocean
- Interactive map of Cook Ice Cap
- Type: Ice cap
- Location: Kerguelen, Southern Indian Ocean
- Coordinates: 49°18′50″S 69°02′29″E
- Area: 400 km^{2} (150 sq mi)
- Length: 28 kilometres (17 mi)
- Thickness: 400 m (1,300 ft) average
- Terminus: Outlet glaciers
- Status: Retreating

The Cook Ice Cap or Cook Glacier (French: Calotte Glaciaire Cook or Glacier Cook) is a large ice cap in the Kerguelen Islands in the French Southern Territories zone of the far Southern Indian Ocean.

== Geography ==
The Cook Ice Cap reaches a maximum elevation of 1,049 metres (3,442 ft) in its central area. It had a surface of approximately 500 km^{2} (190 sq mi) in 1963, having shrunk to about 400 km^{2} (150 sq mi) in recent times.

Named after British explorer James Cook (1728–1779), on French navigational charts of the early 20th century this ice cap appears as "Richthofen Glacier" (Glacier Richthofen).

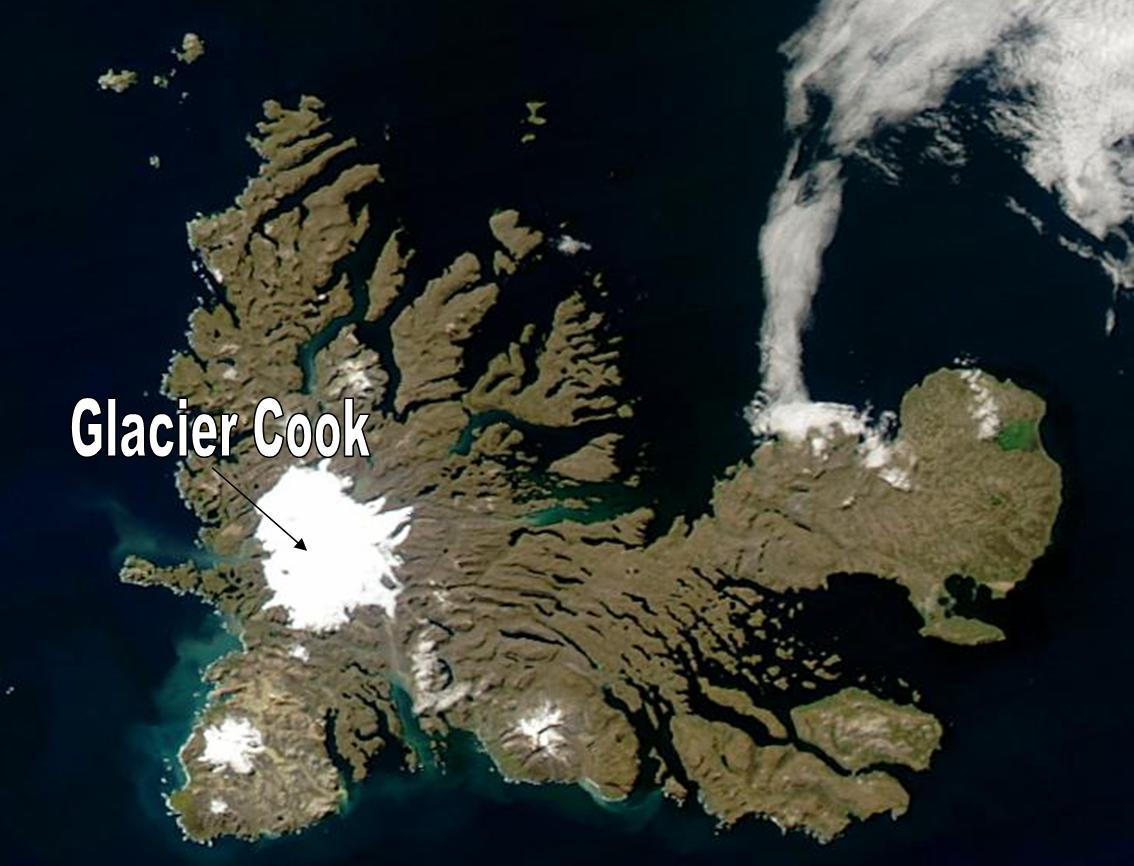
Location in Grande-Terre (Kerguelen) .

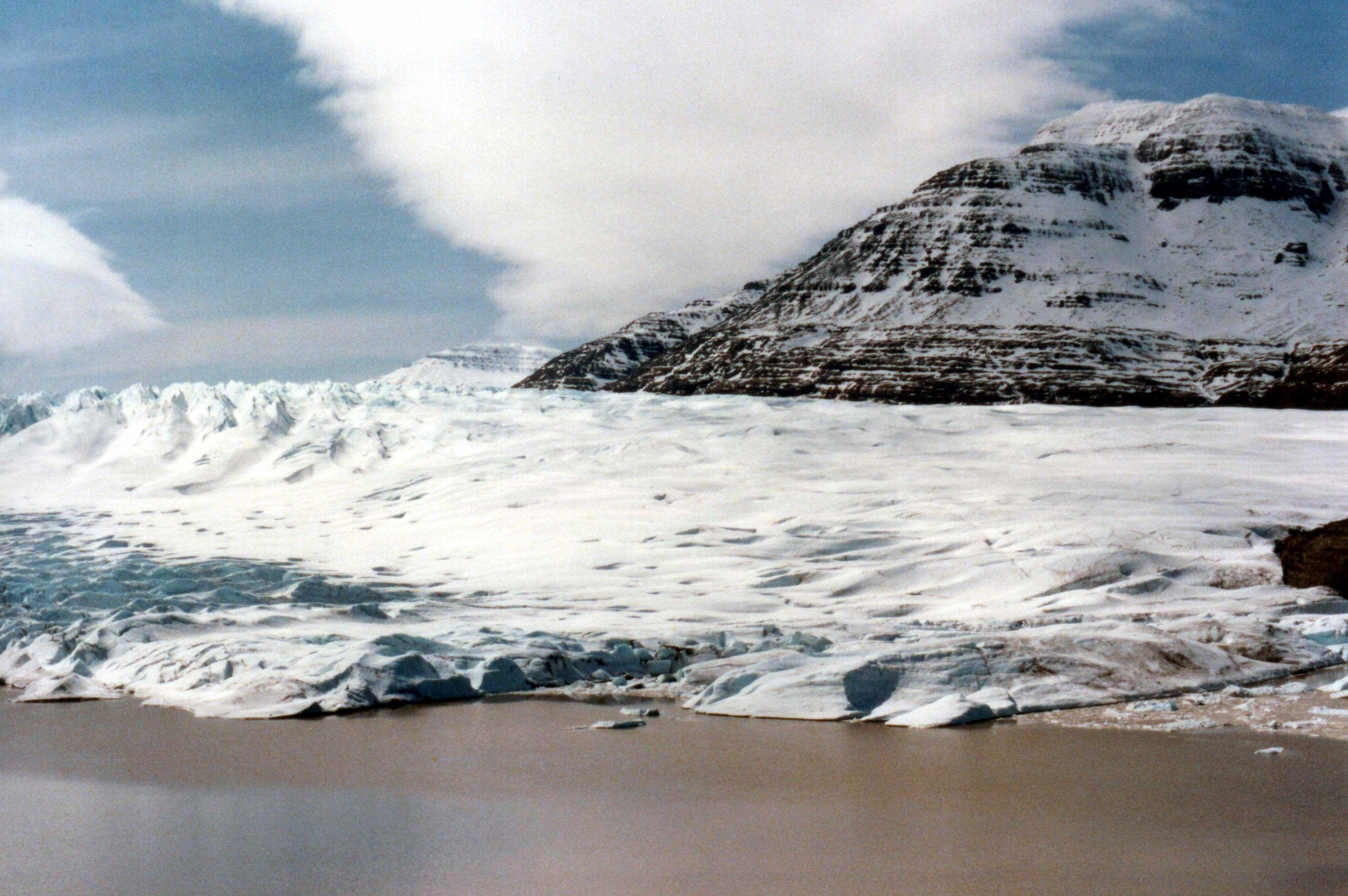
Glacier terminus at the southern end.

=== Glaciers ===
About sixty glaciers flow from the inner ice cap in a roughly radial pattern. At the feet of the snout of these outlet glaciers there are often terminal moraines with dammed lakes of varying sizes. Further down the glacial meltwaters have formed numerous outwash plains at certain, mostly inland, locations. Of the glaciers originating in the Cook Ice Cap, only the Pasteur and Mariotte Glaciers have their termini in the Indian Ocean at the Anse des Glaçons in southwestern Kerguelen's deeply indented coastline.

The following are the main glaciers listed clockwise:

- Agassiz Glacier (Glacier Agassiz)
- Chamonix Glacier (Glacier de Chamonix)
- Dumont d'Urville Glacier (Glacier Dumont d'Urville)
- Vallot Glacier (Glacier Vallot)
- Naumann Glacier (Glacier Naumann)
- Explorateur Glacier (Glacier de l'Explorateur)
- Ampère Glacier (Glacier Ampère)
- La Diozaz Glacier (Glacier de la Diozaz)
- Lavoisier Glacier (Glacier Lavoisier)
- Descartes Glacier (Glacier Descartes)
- Pierre Curie Glacier (Glacier Pierre Curie)
- Pasteur Glacier (Glacier Pasteur)
- Mariotte Glacier (Glacier Mariotte)
- Cauchy Glacier (Glacier Cauchy)

== See also ==
- List of glaciers
