= Alfred Lacroix =

French mineralogist and geologist (1863–1948)

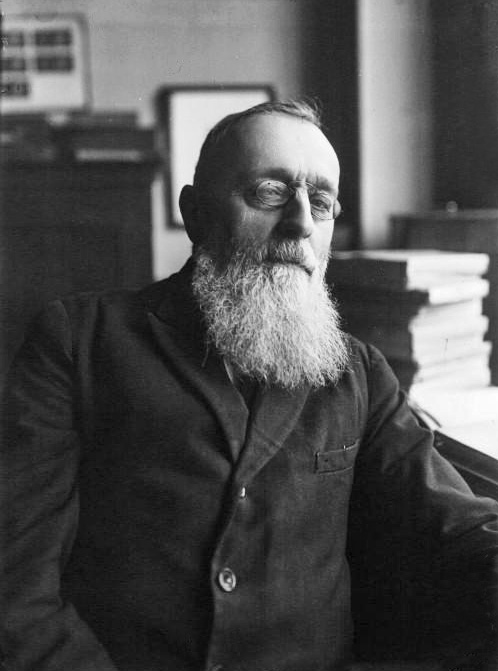
- Alfred Lacroix (1924)
- Born: 4 February 1863; Mâcon, Saône-et-Loire
- Died: 12 March 1948 (aged 85)
- Awards: Wollaston Medal (1917); Hayden Memorial Geological Award (1923); Penrose Medal (1930); Fellow of the Royal Society
- Scientific career
- Fields: mineralogist and geologist
- Doctoral advisor: Ferdinand André Fouqué

Antoine François Alfred Lacroix ForMemRS (4 February 1863 – 12 March 1948), known as Alfred Lacroix, was a French mineralogist and geologist. He was born in Mâcon, Saône-et-Loire.

== Education ==
Alfred Lacroix completed a D. s Sc. in Paris in 1889, as student of Ferdinand André Fouqué. Fouqué only agreed to the graduation if Lacroix would marry his daughter.

== Career ==
In 1893, Alfred Lacroix was appointed professor of mineralogy at the Jardin des Plantes, Paris, and in 1896 director of the mineralogical laboratory in the École des Hautes Études.

He paid especial attention to minerals connected with volcanic phenomena and igneous rocks, to the effects of metamorphism, and to mineral veins, in various parts of the world, notably in the Pyrenees. In his numerous contributions to scientific journals he dealt with the mineralogy and petrology of Madagascar, and published an elaborate and exhaustive volume on the eruptions in Martinique, La Montagne Pelée et ses éruptions (Paris 1904).

He also issued an important work entitled Minéralogie de la France et de ses Colonies (1893–1898), and other works in conjunction with Auguste Michel-Lévy. He was president of the volcanology section (1922–1927) of the International Union of Geodesy and Geophysics (IUGG). He was elected member of the Académie des sciences in 1904. He was awarded the Penrose Medal in 1930.

His will includes a final wish that testifies to his great modesty: “I recall that I want to be buried without ceremony of any kind, in the presence of my family only. This does not mean that I am indifferent to my colleagues, pupils and friends, but I attach little value to external events. I only ask them to devote a small place to me in their memories, which can be done without leaving one's work and normal life.” Alfred Lacroix was buried on 18 March 1948 in the family vault, which has no nominal inscription, at the cimetière du Montparnasse (3rd division, concession 871 P 1827).

== Contributions ==
Alfred Lacroix's work was extensive and covered various scientific areas, including mineralogy, geology, petrology, vulcanology, and the history of sciences. He redefined and enriched the concept of mineral species and emphasized the importance of integrating various methods of observation in understanding minerals' occurrence, associations, genesis, and transformations in nature.

He conducted detailed studies on the role of minerals in the composition of rocks, bridging the gap between mineralogy and petrography. Lacroix's research in contact metamorphism, particularly in the Pyrénées, contributed to our understanding of this geological process. His work also supported the theory that mineralizers and volatile emanations from eruptive magmas played a crucial role in metamorphism.

Alfred Lacroix extensively studied volcanic eruptions and the materials ejected by volcanoes worldwide. His investigations on Mount Pelée shed light on the formation of domes and "nuées ardentes" (pyroclastic flows). He played a significant role in the classification of eruptive rocks, which helped determine their relationships and conditions of formation.

Lacroix's expertise extended to the formation of pegmatites, and he notably studied Madagascar pegmatites, distinguishing between potassium and sodium-lithium pegmatites. He also made significant contributions to the understanding of laterite formation, explaining the concentration of iron and aluminum hydroxides during the alteration of silicate rocks in tropical climates.

His interest in terrestrial rocks led him to the study of meteorites, where he applied the same principles to classify stony meteorites rationally. Additionally, he curated extensive mineralogy and petrography collections at the Museum of Natural History in Paris.

== Travel and exploration ==
Alfred Lacroix was an adventurous traveler who conducted geological and mineralogical research in various regions worldwide. His journeys took him to Scotland, England, Ireland, Scandinavia, North America (Canada and the USA), Germany, Greece, Asia Minor, Japan, Malaya, and Java. He was a pioneer in colonial mineralogy, exploring regions like Martinique, Guadeloupe, Guinea, Madagascar, and Indochina. His observations during these travels greatly enriched scientific knowledge.

One of his notable discoveries was the identification and study of uranium minerals in Madagascar.

== Contributions to the history of sciences ==
Apart from his scientific research, Alfred Lacroix had a deep interest in the history of sciences. He fulfilled his responsibilities as the Secretary of the Academy of Sciences by writing biographies of deceased members. His work in this area resulted in four volumes of captivating studies titled "Figures de Savants," which focused on the lives and contributions of French geologists, mineralogists, and naturalists.

== Recognition and honors ==
Alfred Lacroix's contributions to the scientific community were widely recognized. He received numerous accolades, including being a "Grand Officier" of the Legion of Honor. He held memberships in various academies and received honorary memberships and doctorates "honoris causa" from around sixty universities, foreign institutes, and learned societies. He was also a correspondent of several international scientific organizations.

He received several prestigious medals during his career, including the Penrose Medal.

== Personal life ==
Lacroix's wife died in December 1944.

Lacroix was known for his conscientiousness, open-mindedness, fairness, and kindness. He had a sharp intellect and occasionally displayed a slightly ironic sense of humor. His students and colleagues held deep respect and admiration for him, and he left an enduring legacy in the world of French science.

== Bibliography ==
Alfred Lacroix authored numerous scientific publications throughout his career, contributing significantly to the fields of mineralogy, geology, and petrology. Some of his notable works include:

1. "Les minéraux des roches" (with Auguste Michel-Lévy) – 1888
2. "Tableaux des minéraux des roches" (with Auguste Michel-Lévy) – 1889
3. "Les enclaves des roches volcaniques" – 1893
4. "Minéralogie de la France et de ses Colonies," Vol. III (1901) and Vol. IV (1910)
5. "La Montagne Pelée et ses éruptions" – 1904
6. "Minéralogie de Madagascar," 3 Vols. (1922, 1923)
7. "Figures de Savants," Vol. I-IV (Biographies of French geologists, mineralogists, and naturalists)

Lacroix's publications are known for their meticulous research and valuable contributions to the understanding of mineralogical and geological phenomena.

== Legacy ==
Alfred Lacroix's pioneering work in mineralogy, geology, and petrology, along with his dedication to scientific research, left a mark on the world of science. His extensive collections and writings continue to educate generations of scientists.

A species of Asian snake, Oligodon lacroixi, is named in his honor, as is the Lacroix Glacier in the Taylor Valley of Antarctica.

== Society ==
Antoine Lacroix was one of the founder members in 1930 of the Society of Friends of André-Marie Ampère which was created to develop the first science museum in France, the Ampère Museum close to Lyon.
