= List of museums in Emilia-Romagna =

This is a list of museums in Emilia-Romagna, Italy.

image	name	description	address	city	coordinates	type
	Pinacoteca Nazionale di Bologna	museum of arts in Bologna	via delle Belle Arti, 56 – Bologna	Bologna	44.49778°N 11.35333°E	art museum national museum
	Bologna Gallery of Modern Art		Via Don Minzoni 14	Bologna	44.5025°N 11.3369°E	art museum commercial art gallery
	Bologna Museum of Modern Art	museum in Bologna, Italy	Via Don Minzoni, 14, – Bologna	Bologna	44.5025°N 11.3369°E	art museum commercial art gallery
	Galleria d'arte moderna Aroldo Bonzagni		Via Guercino, 39	Cento	44.7271°N 11.2904°E	art museum
	Verzocchi collection	art museum		Forlì		art museum
	Forlì Municipal Art Gallery	art museum in Forlì, Italy	Piazza Guido da Montefeltro, 12	Forlì		art museum
	Galleria Estense	art museum in Modena	Largo Porta Sant'Agostino, 337	Modena	44.64825°N 10.92066°E	art museum national museum
	Palazzo Farnese	historic palace and museum complex in Piacenza, Italy	Piazza Cittadella, 29	Piacenza	45.0557°N 9.6961°E	art museum military museum
	Collezione Maramotti			Reggio nell’Emilia	44.70838°N 10.60152°E	art museum
	Galleria Ferrari		Via Dino Ferrari, 43, – Maranello	Maranello	44.529678°N 10.861835°E	automobile museum
	Museo Lamborghini		Via Modena, 12, – Sant'Agata Bolognese	Sant'Agata Bolognese	44.39°N 11.33°E	automobile museum
	Cineteca di Bologna	cinema in Bologna, Italy	Riva di Reno 72, 40122 Bologna	Bologna	44.4988658°N 11.3368279°E	cinematheque movie theater
	Museum of Pasta	Italian ethnographic museum dedicated to pasta	Corte di Giarola – strada Giarola, 11	Collecchio	44.740722222222°N 10.174138888889°E	food museum
	Ducati Museum		Via Antonio Cavalieri Ducati, 3 – loc. Borgo Panigale, – Bologna	Bologna	44.516399°N 11.267574°E	museum
	Museum of the Risorgimento, Bologna		Piazza G. Carducci, 5, – Bologna	Bologna	44.4882°N 11.3574°E	museum
	Palazzo Pepoli Vecchio (Bologna)			Bologna	44.492556°N 11.346667°E	museum palace
	Art collection of Fondazione Cassa di Risparmio di Cesena		Corso Garibaldi, 18	Cesena		museum
	Museum of Tomato		Strada Giarola, 11 – Collecchio	Collecchio	44.740722222222°N 10.174138888889°E	museum
	The Archeological Civic Museum (MCA) of Bologna		via dell'Archiginnasio 2	Emilia-Romagna	44.4964°N 11.3422°E	museum
	Musei di San Domenico		Piazza Guido da Montefeltro, 12 – Forlì	Forlì	44.2214061°N 12.0351812°E	museum
	Museum Enzo Ferrari		Via Paolo Ferrari, 85, Modena (MO), Italia	Modena	44.65209°N 10.93633°E	museum
	Museum of Plaster Figurines		Corso Canalgrande, 103, – Modena	Modena	44.647217°N 10.930868°E	museum
	Galleria nazionale di Parma	museum in Parma	Piazza della Pilotta 6	Parma	44.80527778°N 10.32638889°E	museum
	Teatro Farnese	baroque theatre in Parma, Italy	Piazza della Pilotta, 15	Parma	44.804574°N 10.325673°E	museum theater
	Museo Glauco Lombardi		Strada Garibaldi, 15, – Parma	Parma	44.803708333333°N 10.327972222222°E	museum
	Fondazione Cariparma	Italian banking foundation	Strada al Ponte Caprazucca, 4, – Parma	Parma	44.798536111111°N 10.326038888889°E	museum
	The Bodoni Museum		Piazzale della Pilotta, 3 – Parma	Parma	44.8047°N 10.3257°E	museum
	Galleria d'arte moderna Ricci Oddi	Italian museum	Via San Siro 13, – Piacenza	Piacenza	45.04848889°N 9.69201667°E	art museum
	Archiepiscopal Museum, Ravenna		Piazza Arcivescovado, 1, – Ravenna	Ravenna	44.4156°N 12.1978°E	museum
	International museum and library of music	Bologna	Strada Maggiore, 34, – Bologna	Bologna	44.4927°N 11.3501°E	music museum music library
	Palazzo Schifanoia	palace of the d'Este and museum in Ferrara	Via Scandiana, 23	Ferrara	44.830482°N 11.629075°E	palace museum
	Palazzo Santa Margherita, Modena		Corso Canal Grande, 103	Modena	44.64727°N 10.93094°E	palace art museum
	Pinacoteca Domenico Inzaghi, Budrio		Palazzo della Partecipanza, Via Mentana, 32, – Budrio	Budrio	44.537987°N 11.536822°E	pinacotheca
	Pinacoteca Comunale di Cesena		Via Aldini, 26, – Cesena	Cesena	44.13777778°N 12.24777778°E	pinacotheca
	Camerini d'alabastro	Study of Alfonso I d'Este, Duke of Ferrara, Modena and Reggio		Ferrara	44.83695°N 11.61912222°E	studiolo
	Studiolo di Belfiore	historic principal study of Lionello d'Este in 1447		Ferrara		studiolo
