= Mineralogical Collection "Luigi Bombicci Museum" =

Museum in Bologna, Italy

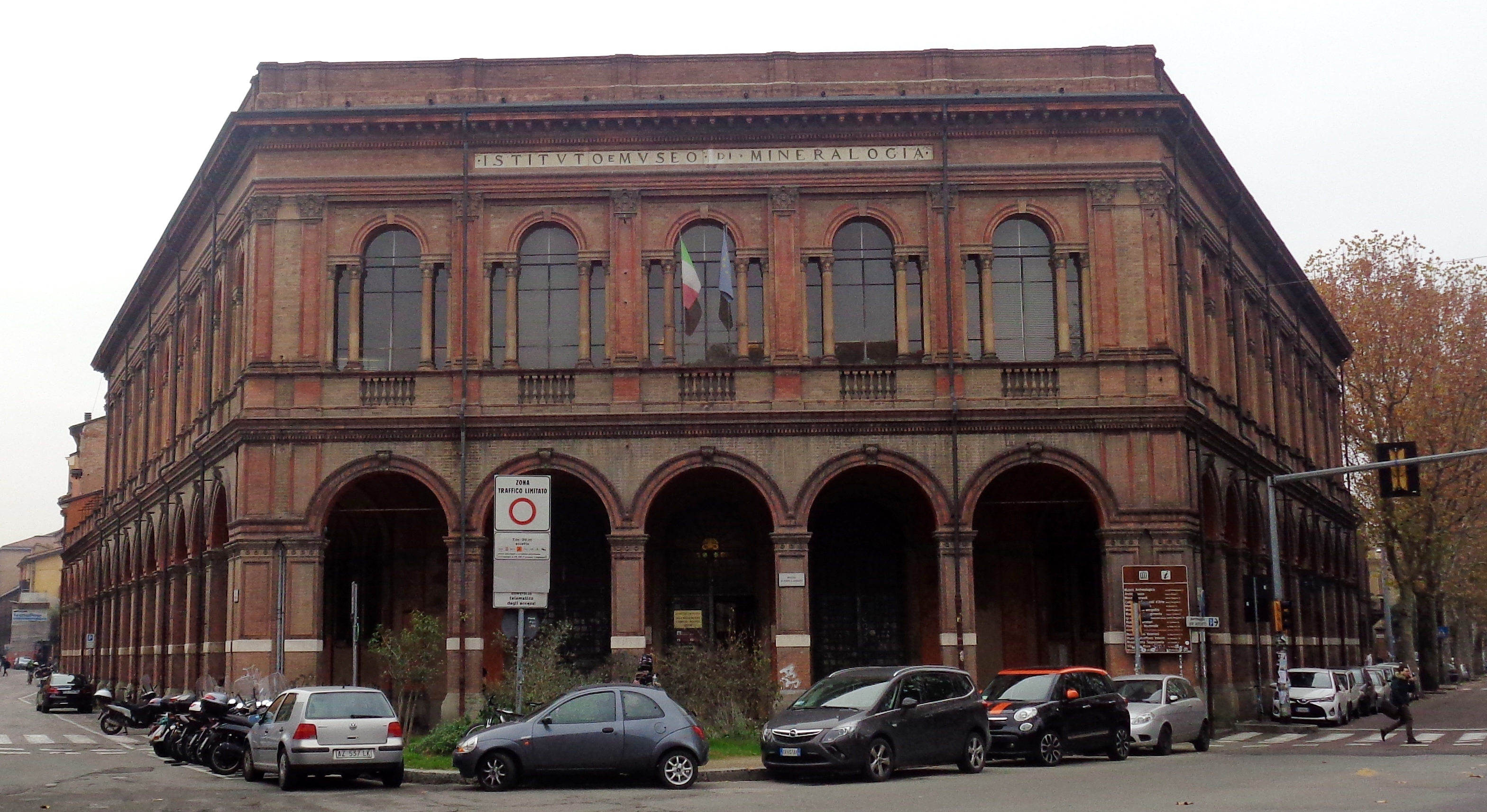
- Location: Bologna, Italy
- Coordinates: 44°29′53″N 11°21′21″E
- Type: natural history museum museum of a public entity
- Collection size: 9,000 item
- Area: 778 m^{2} (8,370 sq ft)
- Visitors: 1,400 (2020), 5,172 (2018), 1,158 (2021), 2,568 (2022)
- Website: sma.unibo.it/it/il-sistema-museale/collezione-di-mineralogia-luigi-bombicci
- Location of Mineralogical Collection "Luigi Bombicci Museum"

Mineralogical Collection "Luigi Bombicci Museum" is a mineralogy and natural history museum, situated in Bologna, Italy, near Porta San Donato.

== Description ==
The "Luigi Bombicci Museum" is a university museum, part of the SMA (Sistema Museale di Ateneo), the network of Museums and Collections of the University of Bologna. It is named after Luigi Bombicci, the first holder of the Chair of Mineralogy at the University of Bologna, among the main promoters of the collection.

It received 2,568 visitors annually in 2022. A pic of entries was registered in 2018, before COVID-19 pandemic, with 5,172 visitors annually.

== History ==
The museum was founded in 20th century.

== Collection ==
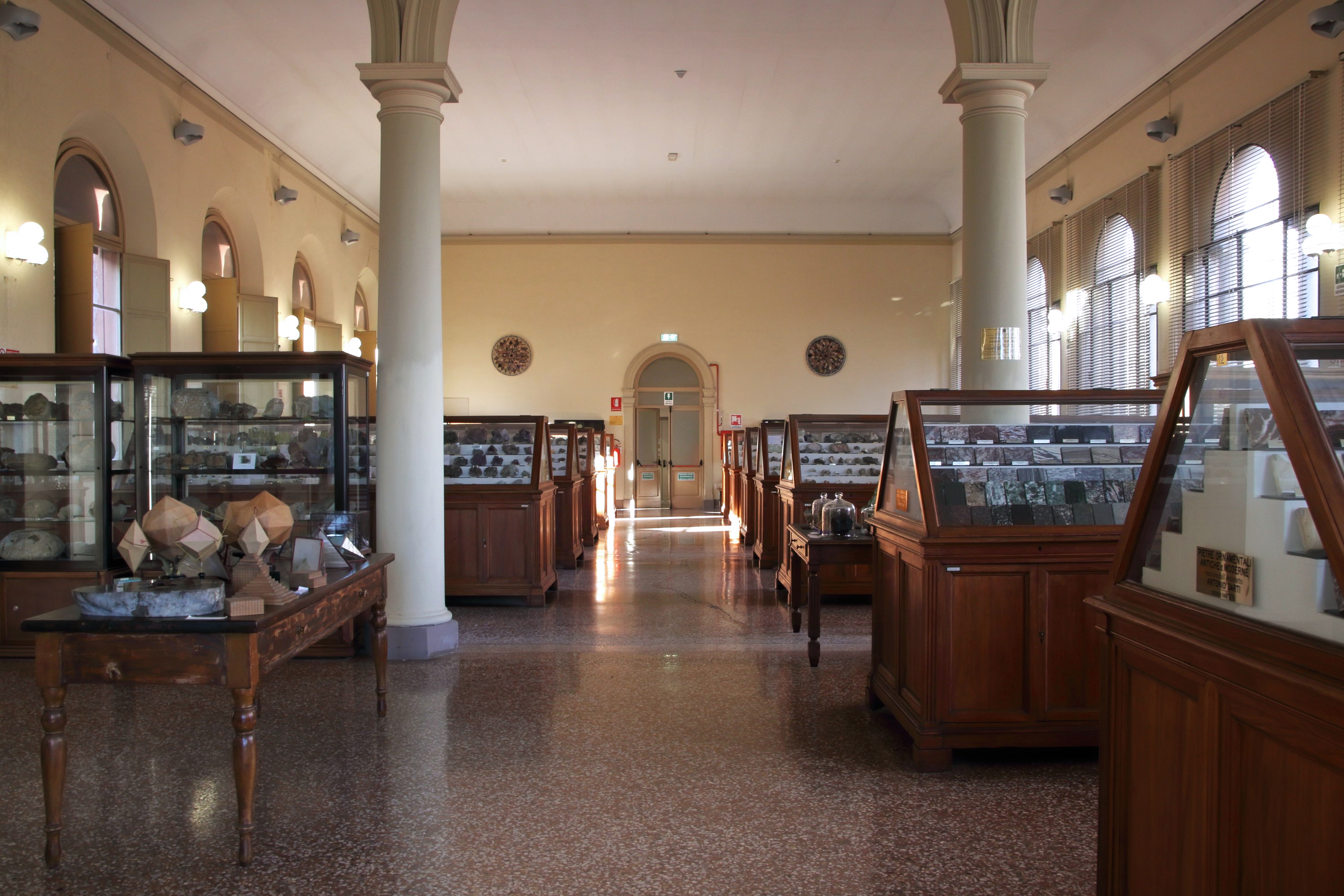
Interior of the museum

The museum contains 50,000 items but exhibits only a part of them, over 10,000 mineral samples divided into various thematic collections, some of which are of particular scientific interest, such as the section dedicated to the geo-mineralogical aspects of the Bolognese territory, over 600 ancient marbles, ambers, 150 meteorite fragments including the Renazzo carbonaceous chondrite.

In addition, the museum collects and exhibits numerous ancient scientific instruments.

== Architecture ==
The museum, which occupies an area of 850 m^{2}, is located on the first floor of the building that also houses the Department of Earth Sciences of the University of Bologna. The building, with its Renaissance style, was transformed by architects Pasquale Penza and Flavio Bastiani between 1860 and 1903, at the request of Professor Luigi Bombicci.

== Gallery ==
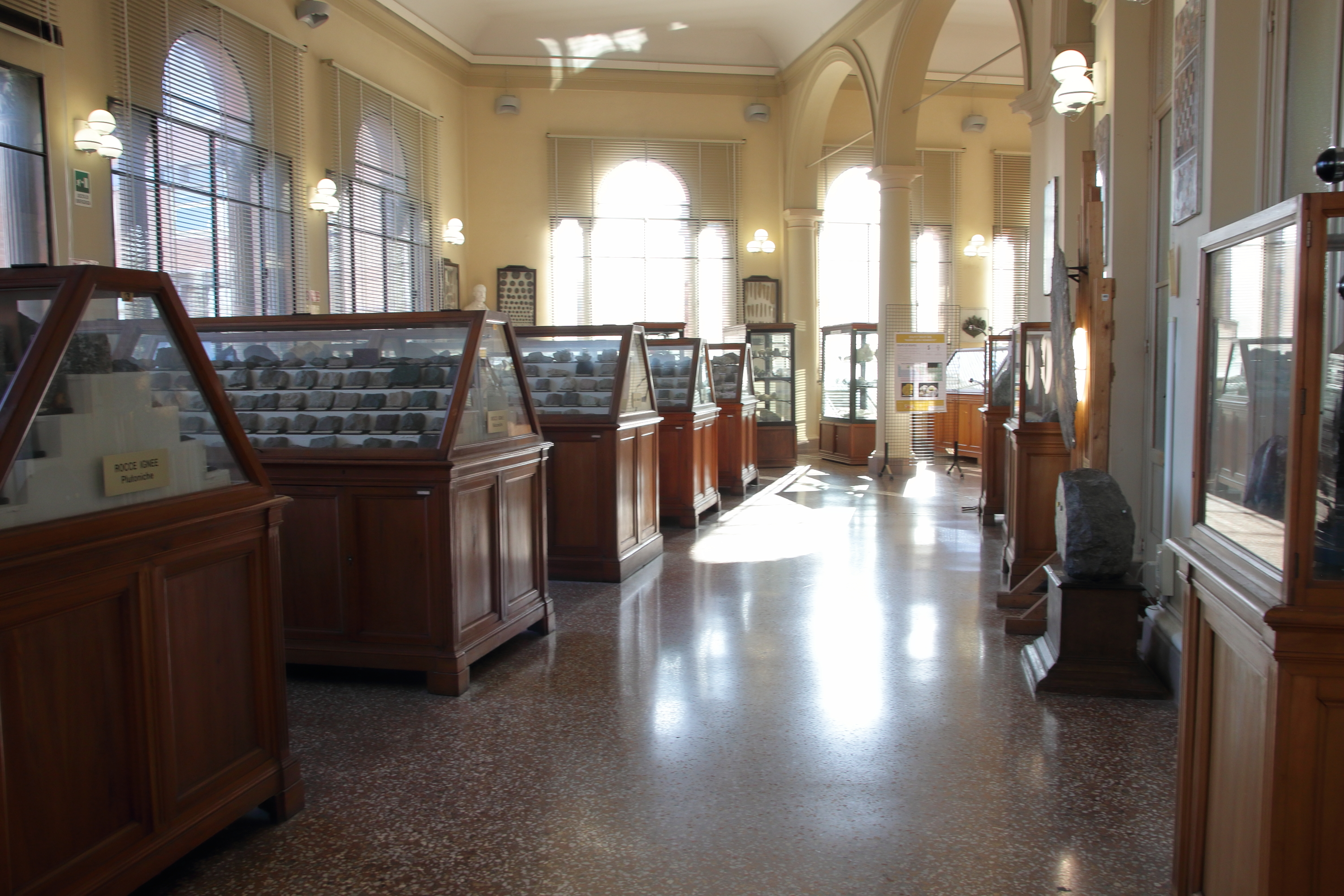
Interior of the museum

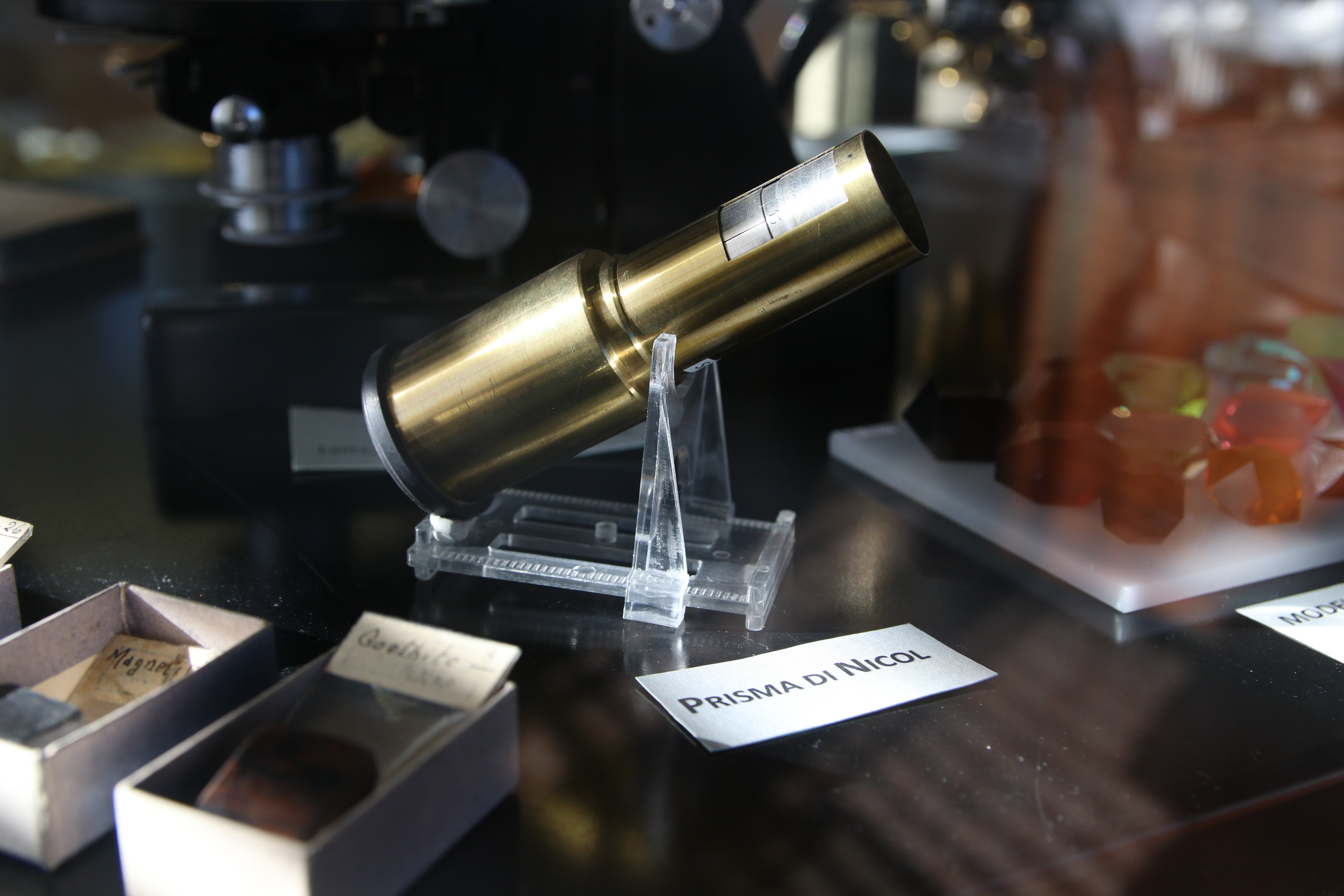
Nicol prism

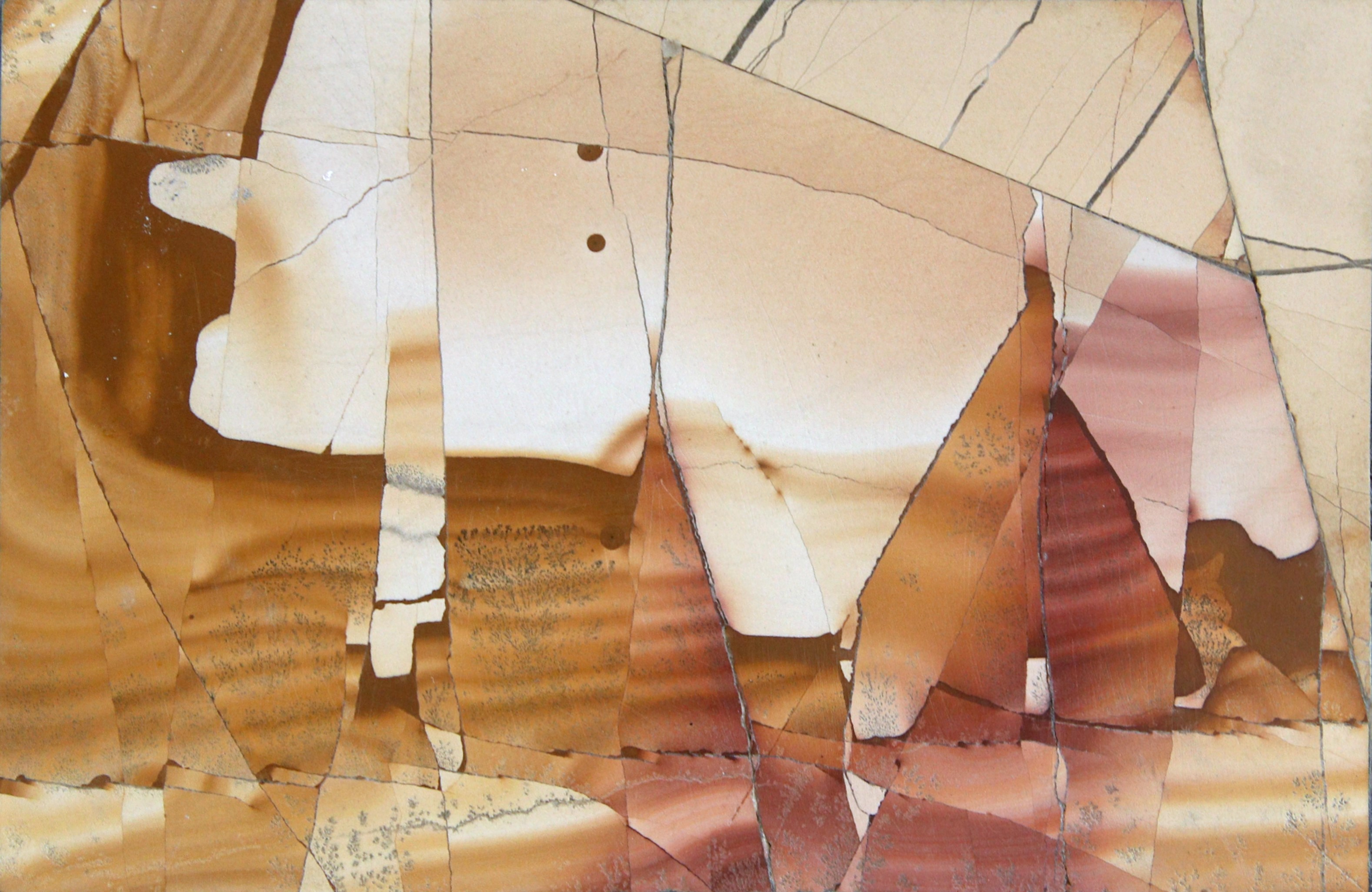
Ruin marble

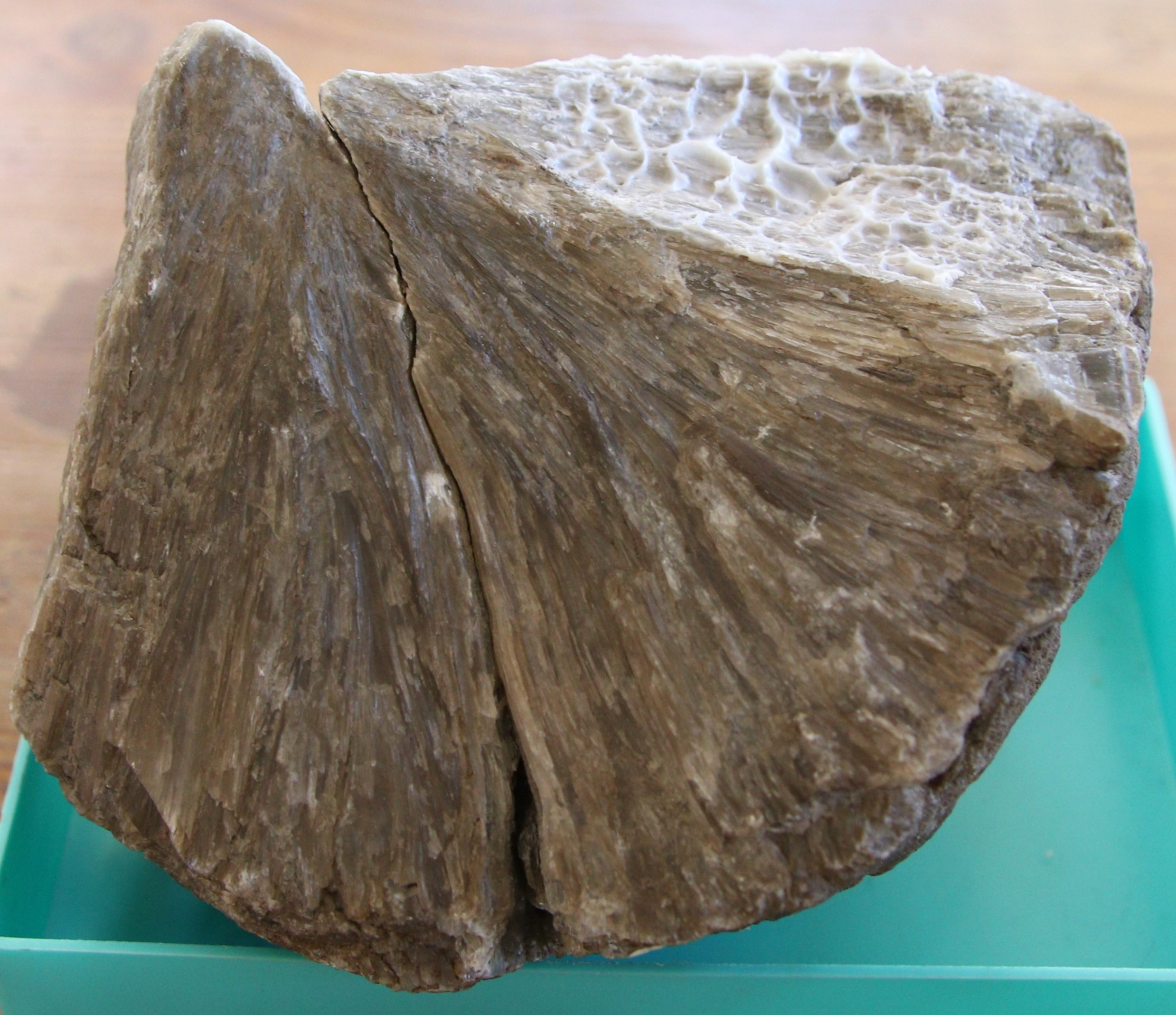
Bologna Stone

== See also ==
- List of museums in Emilia-Romagna
- List of natural history museums
