= Henry Moyes =

Blind Scottish science lecturer (1750–1807)

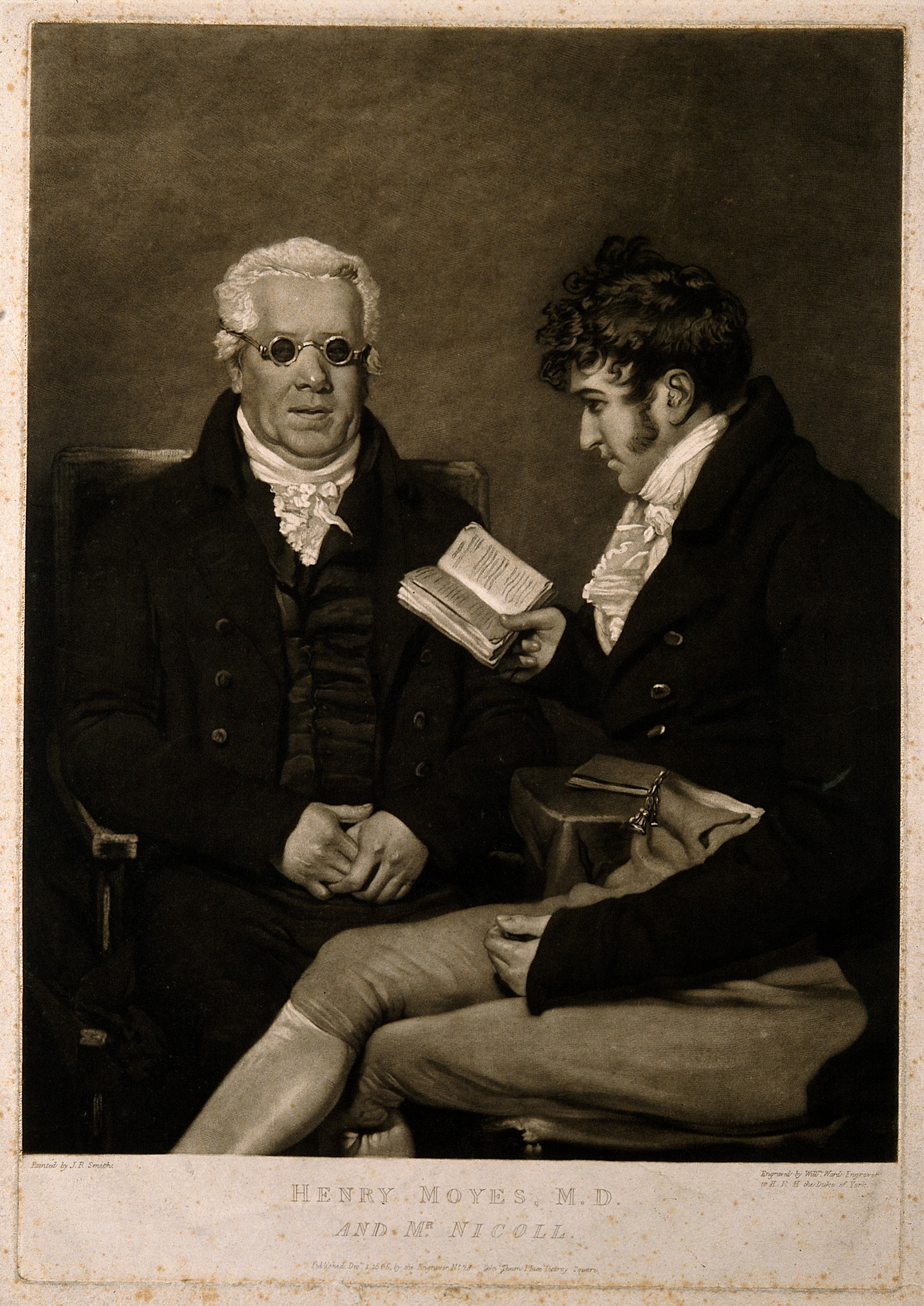
- Henry Moyes. Mezzotint by W. Ward, 1806, after J. R. Smith
- Born: 1750
- Died: 1807 (aged 56–57)
- Occupation: lecturer on natural philosophy

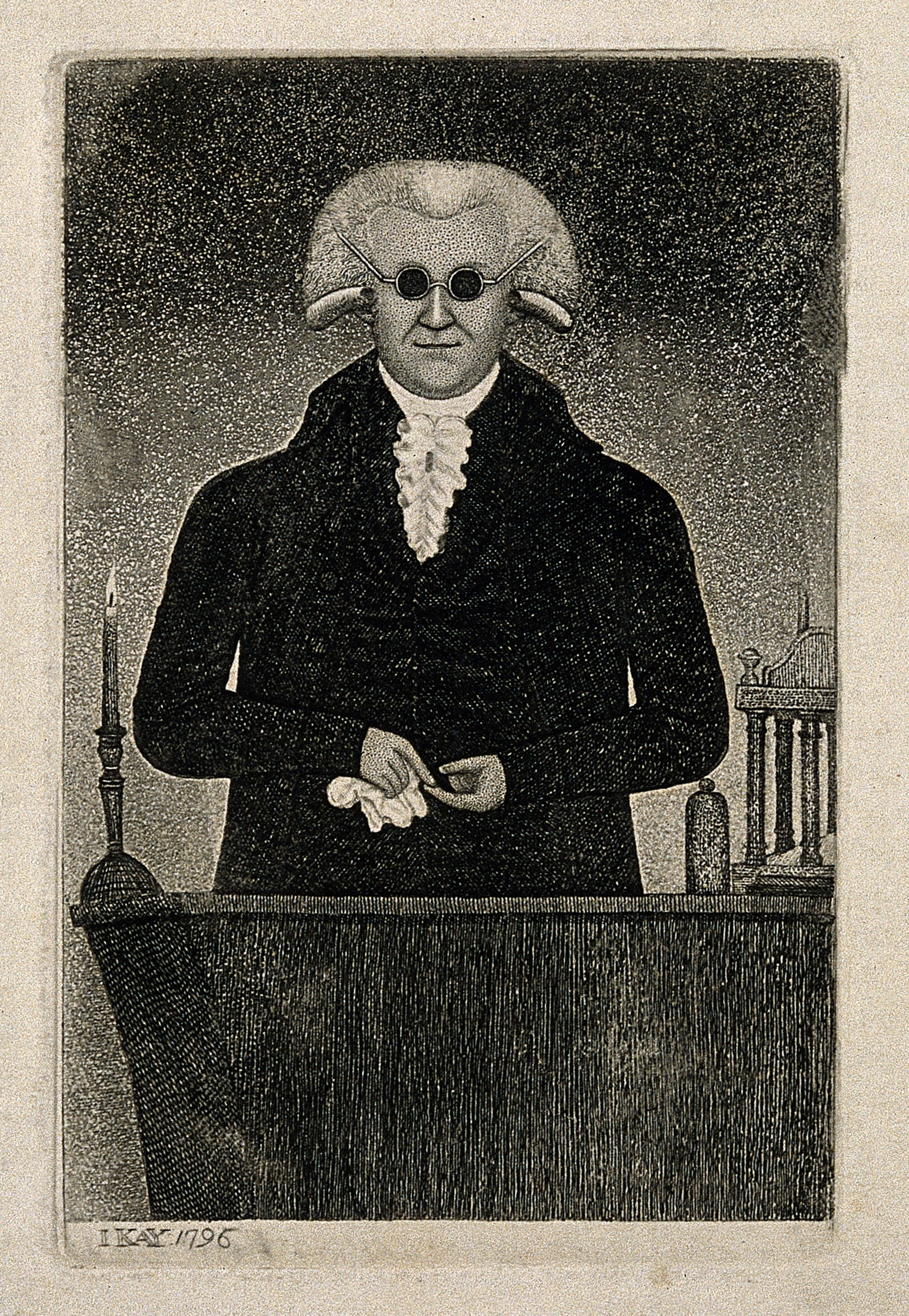
Henry Moyes. Etching by John Kay (1796)

Henry Moyes (1750–1807) was a blind Scottish lecturer on natural philosophy.

== Life ==
As an itinerant public speaker he helped raise 18th century popular interest in the new field of chemistry. He mixed with the greatest engineers and scientists of the day and attended the Lunar Society. In London he shared a room in George Street, Hanover Square with Adam Walker where lectures were given to small groups of gentry. Moyes was described as an excellent lecturer in philosophy by Joseph Priestley. His portrait was painted by John Russell.

He was born in 1750 and came from a humble Kirkcaldy background and was blinded aged three by smallpox. In 1766, he was befriended by Adam Smith, when the latter was in Kirkcaldy writing his Wealth of Nations. The boy showed precocious aptitude and, as well as teaching Moyes himself, Smith secured the patronage of David Hume and Thomas Reid in the young man's education.

Being blind, he required assistance for demonstrations and his assistant, nephew William Nicol, would himself become notable for his contributions to science.

From 1778 he gave his lectures in a building constructed by Allan Ramsay at the foot of Carrubbers Close as a theatre but known as St Andrews Chapel.

During 1784–86, he toured the United States giving successful lectures in Boston, Philadelphia, Baltimore, Princeton and Charleston, South Carolina. He was elected a Foreign Honorary Member of the American Academy of Arts and Sciences in 1785. Thereafter, he settled in Manchester, England, and undertook a tour of Ireland.

His brother was '"Old Moses" the dreary, drowsy, drone' (Episcopalian Minister of the Cowgate, Edinburgh).

== Freemasonry ==
Moyes was an Affiliate Member of Lodge Holyrood House (St Luke's), No.44, (Edinburgh, Scotland). It is not, yet, known in which Lodge he was Initiated. That he was totally blind was not (and is not) an impediment to his becoming a Freemason.
