= Mario Sironi =

Italian painter

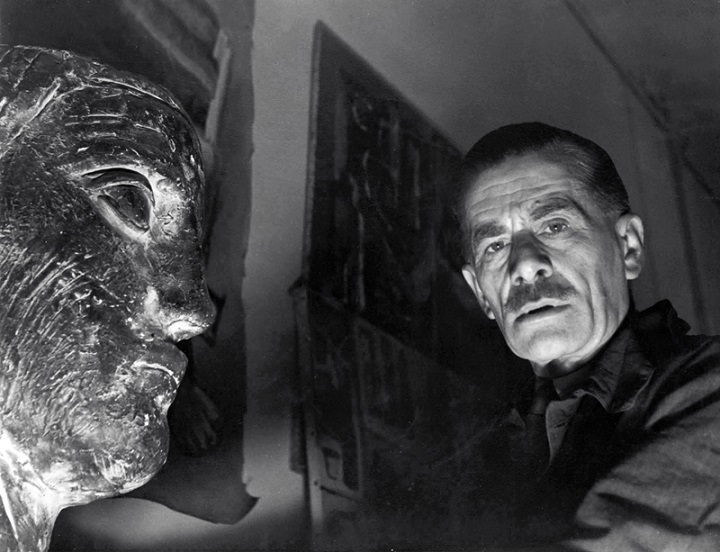
- Mario Sironi in 1938
- Born: May 12, 1885; Sassari, Kingdom of Italy
- Died: August 13, 1961 (aged 76); Milan, Italy
- Known for: Painting
- Movement: Modernism

Signature
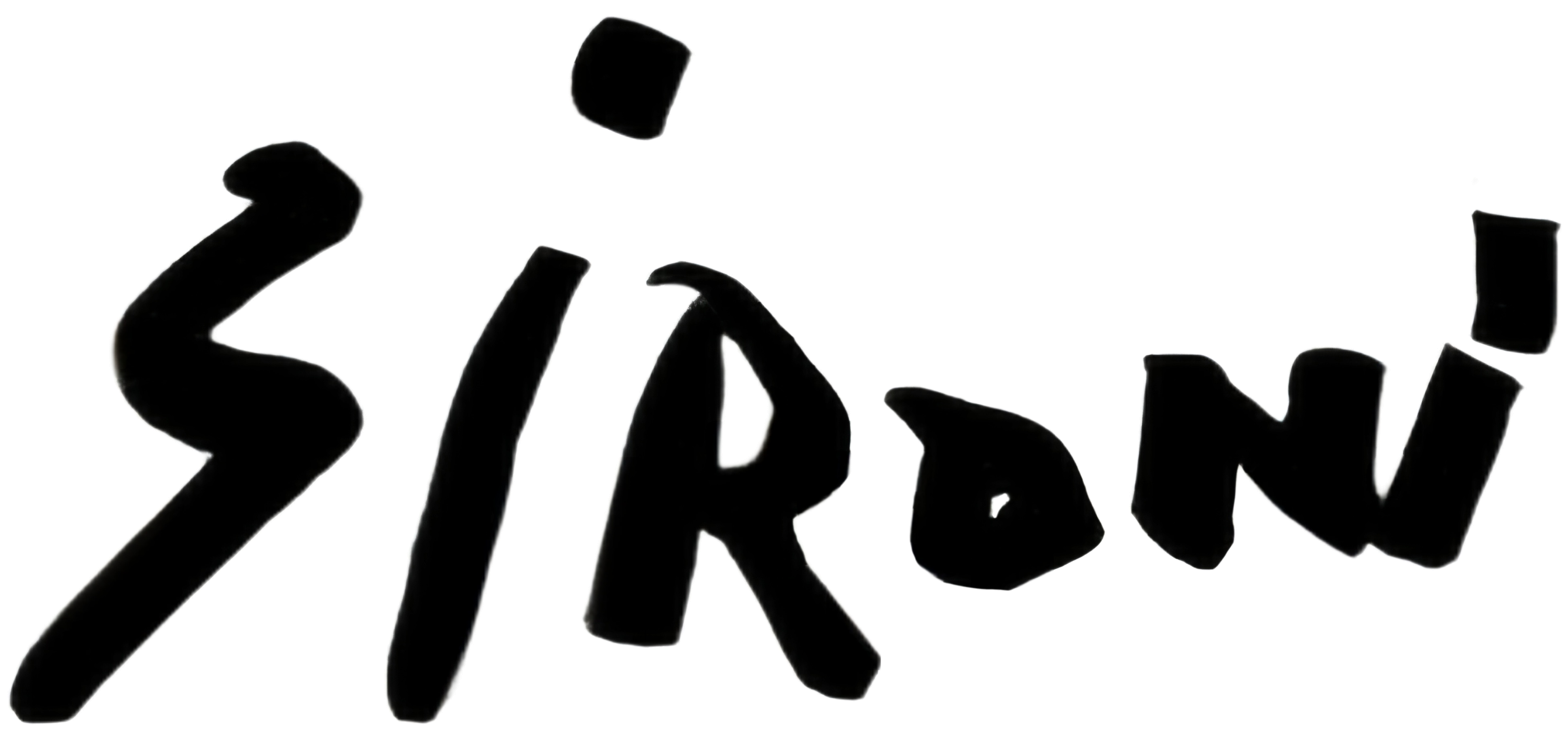

Mario Sironi (May 12, 1885 – August 13, 1961) was an Italian Modernist artist who was active as a painter, sculptor, illustrator, and designer. His typically somber paintings are characterized by massive, immobile forms.

== Biography ==
He was born in Sassari, on the island of Sardinia. His father was an engineer; his maternal grandfather was the architect and sculptor Ignazio Villa. Sironi spent his childhood in Rome. He embarked on the study of engineering at the University of Rome but quit after a nervous breakdown in 1903, one of many severe depressions that would recur throughout his life. Thereafter he decided to study painting, and began attending the Scuola Libera del Nudo of the Accademia di Belle Arti di Roma. There he met Giacomo Balla, who became "his first real teacher". Sironi returned to Milan in 1905 before traveling to Paris in 1906. Like his friends Gino Severini and Umberto Boccioni, he began painting in a Divisionist style under the guidance of Balla. Sironi's works from this period include self-portraits and portraits of his family.

He saw Expressionist works during visits to Germany between 1908 and 1911, but mainly stayed in Rome from 1909 to 1914. By 1913, Balla, Boccioni and Severini had developed a new style—Futurism—which Sironi also adopted for a brief time, although his work showed little of the characteristic Futurist exaltation of speed and modernity. In 1914 he exhibited with the Futurists at the Galleria Sprovieri in Rome. Works from this period include several abstract tempera paintings entitled Composizione futurista (1915), a series of paintings of airplanes in tempera or tempera with collage, and several paintings of lone cyclists or motorcyclists.

Sironi served in World War I as a member of the Lombard Volunteer Cyclists and Drivers. After the war, he abandoned Futurism and developed a style that emphasized massive, immobile forms. In paintings such as La Lampada of 1919 (Pinacoteca di Brera, Milan), mannequins substitute for figures, as in the metaphysical paintings of Giorgio de Chirico and Carlo Carrà. In 1922, Sironi was one of the founders of the Novecento Italiano movement, which was part of the return to order in European art during the post-war period. Paintings such as Venere of 1921–1923 (Galleria Civica d'Arte Moderna, Turin) and Solitudine ("Solitude", 1925; Galleria Nazionale d'Arte Moderna, Rome), with their contained, geometric forms, bear some kinship to the Neoclassicism evident in works produced at the same time by Picasso.

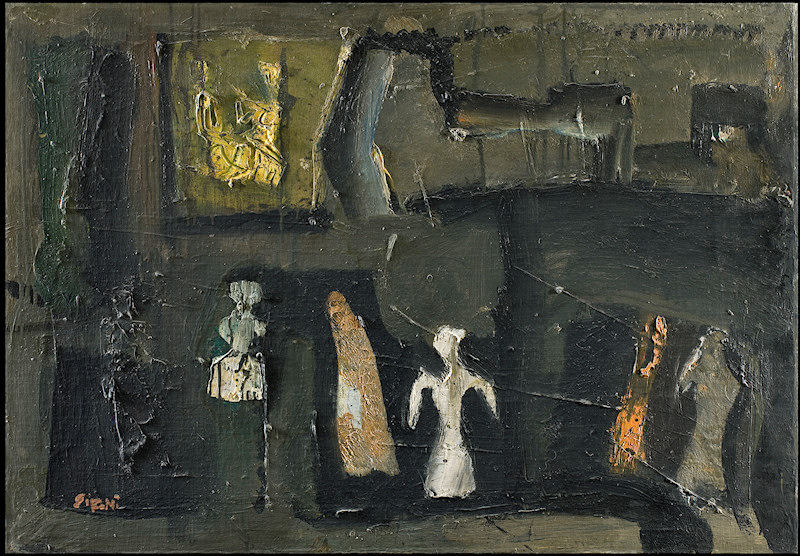
Composizione o Composizione e figure, 1957 (Fondazione Cariplo)

La lampada, 1919, oil on canvas, 78 x 56 cm, Pinacoteca di Brera, Milan

In the late 1920s, Sironi painted monumental figures of nudes, peasants, and family groupings in bare, mountainous landscapes. In these works—described by Fabio Benzi as "marked by a sense of humanity burdened with history ... [and] an almost Romanesque spirit of a solemn expressionism"—the pure forms of Sironi's earlier work were replaced by a primitivist form of classicism, and his style became more painterly. In paintings of fishermen at work or drinkers in cafés, he adopted a deliberately ungainly style similar to that of Georges Rouault.

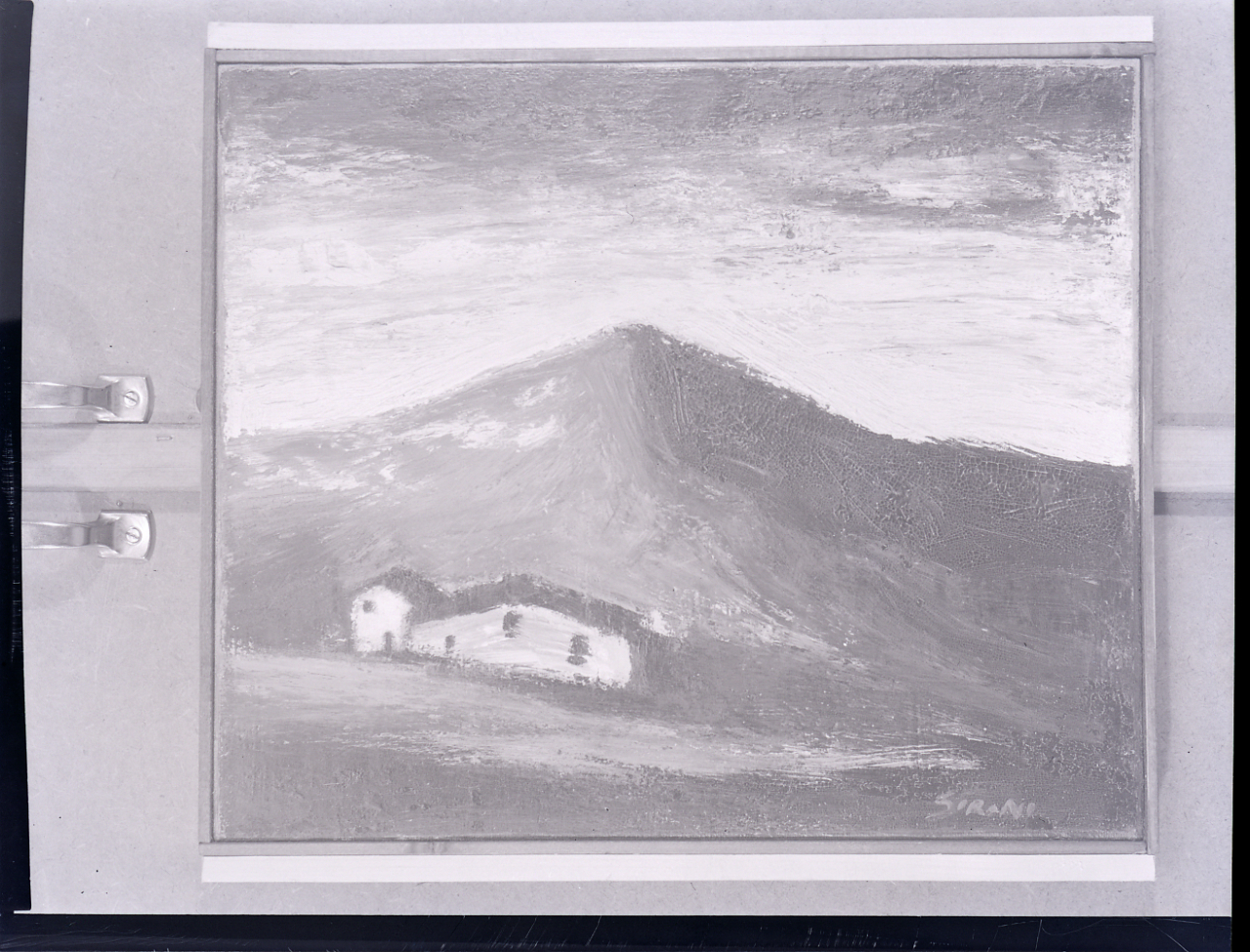
Painting by Sironi photographed by Paolo Monti

A supporter of Mussolini, Sironi contributed a large number of cartoons—over 1700 in all—to Il Popolo d'Italia and La Rivista Illustrata del Popola d'Italia, the Fascist newspapers. Rejecting the art market and the concept of the easel painting, he became committed to the ideal of a fusion of decoration and architecture, as exemplified by Gothic cathedrals. He felt that the mural was the proper basis of a popular national art. The state commissioned from him several large-scale decorative works in the 1930s, such as the mural L'Italia fra le arti e le scienze (Italy Between the Arts and Sciences) of 1935, and he also contributed to the Exhibition of the Fascist Revolution in 1932. Although his esthetic of brutal monumentality represented the dominant style of Italian fascism, his work was attacked by right-wing critics for its lack of overt ideological content.

As an artist closely identified with Fascism, Sironi's reputation declined dramatically in the post-World War II period. Embittered by the course of events, he had returned to easel painting in 1943, and worked in relative isolation. His withdrawal from society increased after the death of his daughter Rossana by suicide in 1948. The paintings of his later years sometimes approach abstraction, resembling assemblages of archaeological fragments, or juxtaposed sketches. He continued working until shortly before his death on August 13, 1961, in Milan.

== Legacy ==
During his lifetime, Sironi exhibited internationally. It is possible that the cellular style of his compositions exhibited in the US during the 1930s influenced WPA muralists. In the postwar years, Sironi fell from favor due to his earlier association with Fascism, and was accorded little attention from art historians. A revival of interest in Sironi's work began in the 1980s, when his work was featured in major exhibitions, notably Les Réalismes at the Centre Georges Pompidou (1981) and Italian Art in the Twentieth Century at the Royal Academy of Arts, London (1989).

Public collections holding works by Sironi include Galleria Civica d'Arte Moderna in the Palazzo Massari, Ferrara; Galleria Civica di Modena in Palazzo Santa Margherita; Civico Museo d'Arte Contemporanea, Milan; Museo del Novecento, Milan; Pinacoteca di Brera, Milan; Galleria Comunale d'Arte Moderna, Rome; Revoltella Museum, Trieste; Ca' Pesaro, Venice; Guggenheim Collection, Venice; Neue Nationalgalerie, Berlin; Tate Gallery, London; the Musée National d'Art Moderne, Paris; the Vatican Museums; and the Kunsthaus Zürich, Zurich.
