= Dorsum Nicol =

Wrinkle ridge on the Moon

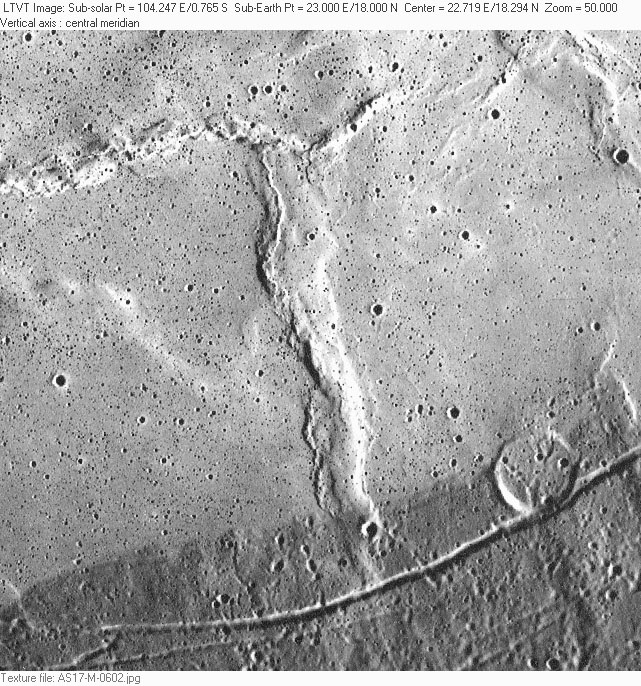
Dorsum Nicol

Dorsum Nicol is a wrinkle ridge on the Moon at 18.0°N 23.0°E in Mare Serenitatis near the border of Mare Tranquilitatis. It is 44 km long and was named after Scottish physicist William Nicol in 1976.

To the south of Dorsum Nicol are the Rimae Plinius and Plinius crater, and to the southeast is the small crater Brackett. To the north and perpendicular to Dorsum Nicol are the Dorsa Lister.
