= Renazzo meteorite =

Meteorite found in Renazzo, Italy

Renazzo
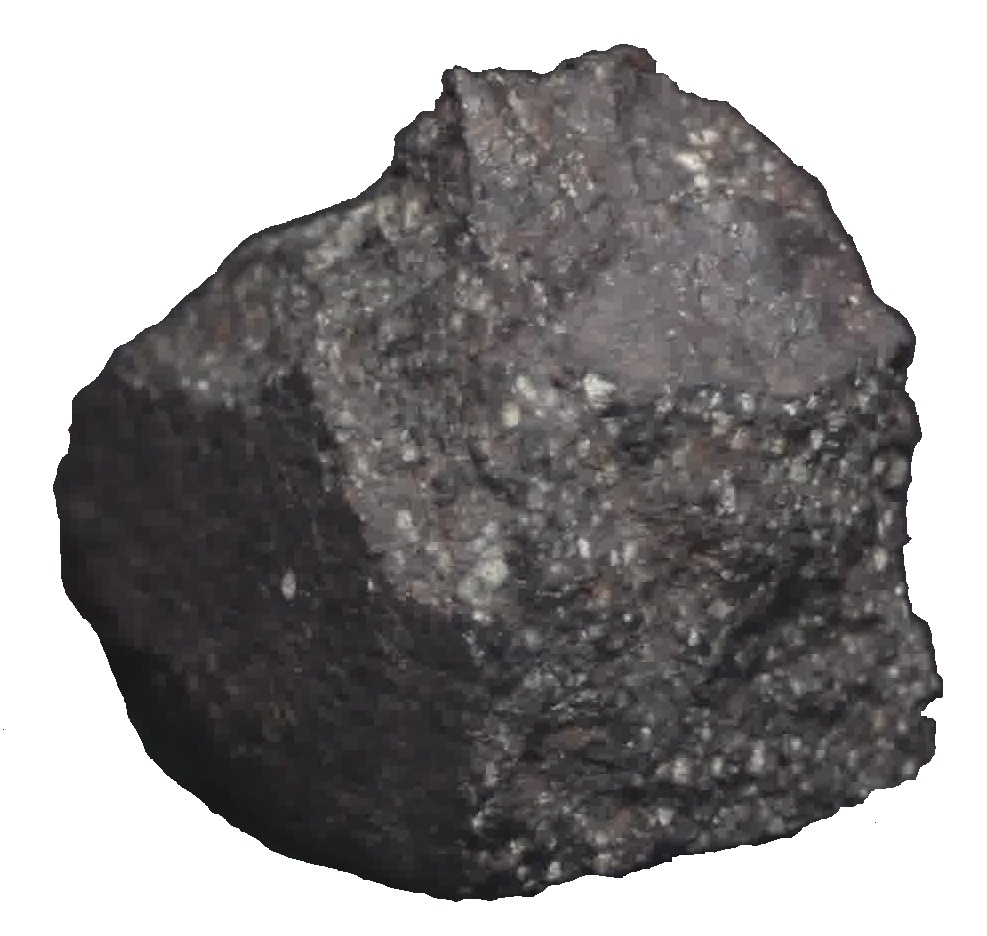
- Renazzo Meteorite.
- Type: Stone
- Class: Carbonaceous chondrite
- Group: CR
- Country: Italy
- Region: Emilia-Romagna
- Coordinates: 44.7669444°N 11.2961111°E
- Observed fall: Yes
- Fall date: January 1824
- TKW: 1 kg

Renazzo is a carbonaceous chondrite, the progenitor of an entire family indicated with the acronym CR (Renazzo-type chondrite). The largest fragment has a blackish fusion crust. Inside the cosmic body there are also white and orange chondrules, pre-solar grains and in minimal quantities there are also CAIs, all trapped in a blackish colored amalgam with reddish and dark brown reflections.

== Specimens ==
The largest fragment of the Renazzo meteorite, weighing approximately 308g, is preserved in the Mineralogical Collection "Luigi Bombicci Museum" of the SMA of the University of Bologna. Other fragments are scattered around the world in museums and private collections (see the map).

The historical inscription placed on the Meteorite reads:

Ferrum nativum meteoricum granularis. Aerolitho delapso non procul ad ecclesiam san sebastiani di Renazzo 18 kal Feb 1824 (Ferrous meteorite with granules (chondrules). Aerolite fell not far from the church of San Sebastiano di Renazzo 15th January 1824)

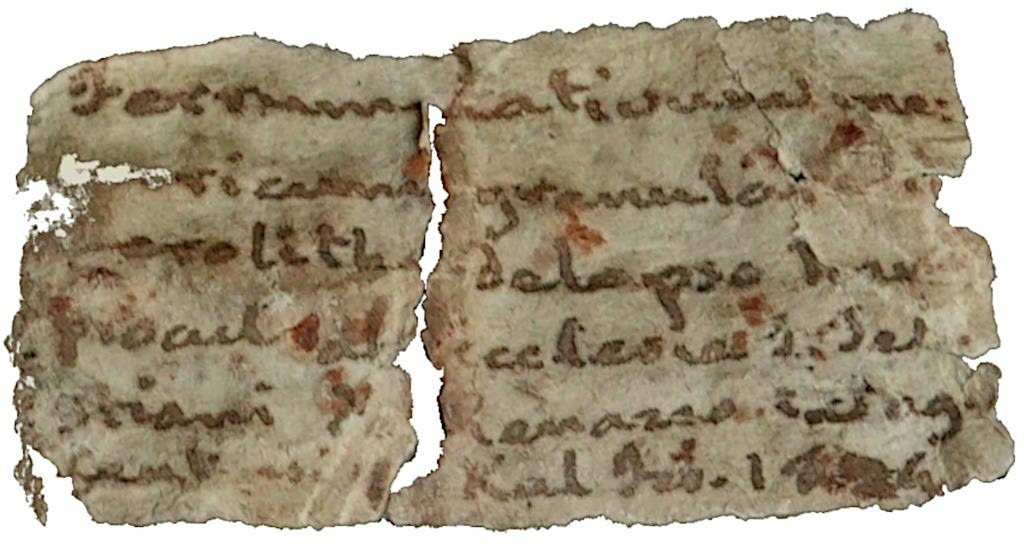
Inscription on Renazzo Meteorite

Map of the main european museums which hold a fragment of the Renazzo Meteorite
Map of the main extra-european museums which hold a fragment of the Renazzo Meteorite

== History ==
In January 1824 (officially January 15th) a meteorite fell in Renazzo at around 8.30pm. The chronicles report an intense flash in the sky, three loud explosions and a rain of fire that fell on Renazzo, frightening the villagers, but without causing any damage. One witness was Gallerani who saw some fragments fall on her farm. She saw a strong flash followed by three loud explosions and a thousand crackles similar to musketry shots, a noise like metal banging and then a ball of fire surrounded by a thousand flames becoming brighter and brighter and going out shortly thereafter.

She said that in the night it was still possible to observe the meteorite falling even in the dark flight phase to the ground.

The following days many went to the fields and collected the stones which were similar to the iron foam from the blacksmiths' forges. The two main fragments were collected in the Gallerani field: one stuck in the ground not far from a tree, the other a short distance away in a frozen ditch. On January 28, Monsignor Primicerio Camillo Ranzani went to Renazzo to study what happened and collect the fragments.

=== Original chronicle by Antonio Barbieri ===
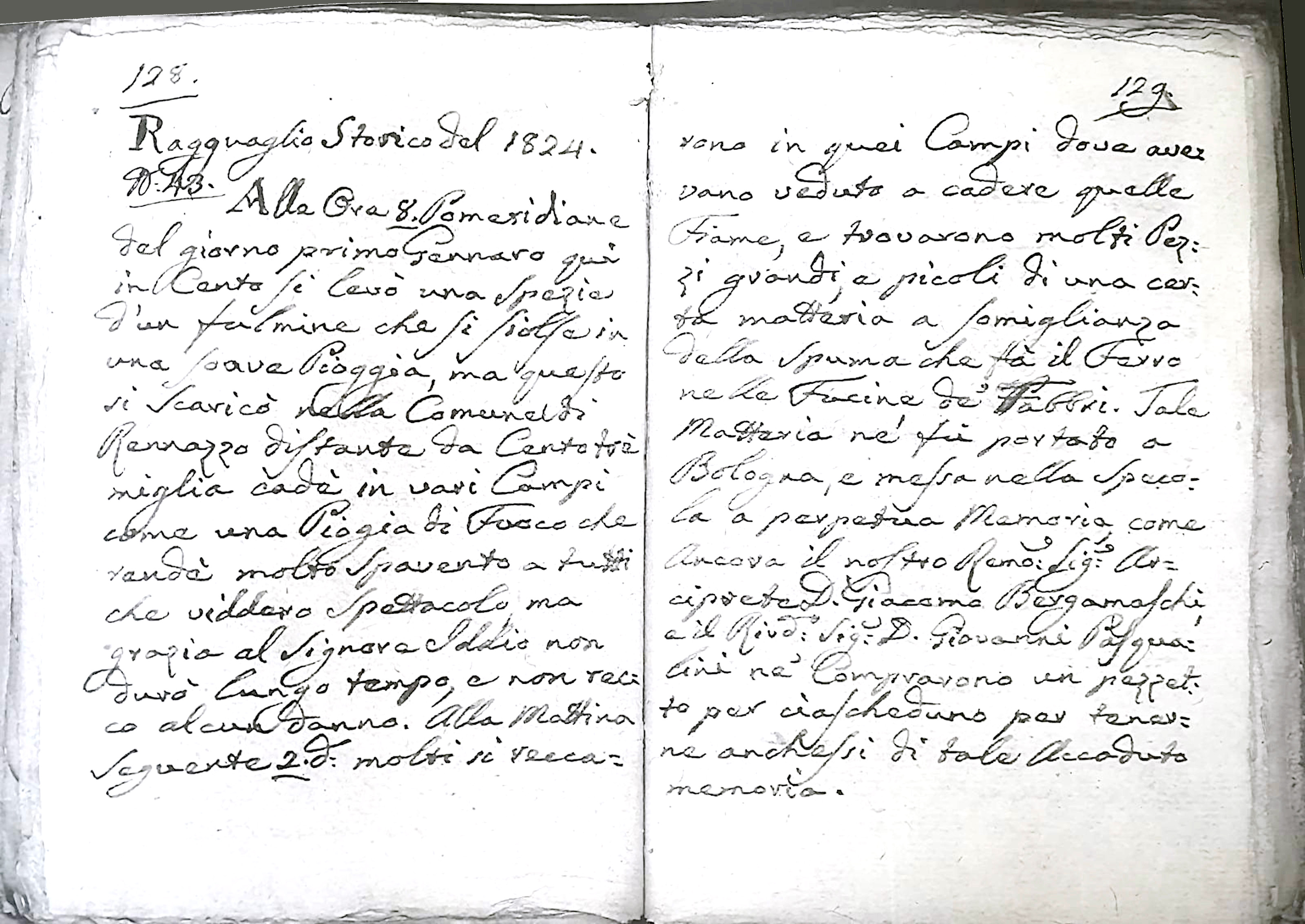
Renazzo Meteorite - Chronicle by Barbieri

Alla ora 8 pomeridiane del giorno primo Gennaro qui in Cento si levò una spezia d’un fulmine che si sciolse in una soave Pioggia, ma questo si scaricò nella Comunità Renazzo distante da Cento tre miglia cadè in vari campi come una pioggia di Fuoco che manda molto spavento a tutti che viddero spettacolo ma grazie al signore Iddio non durò lungo tempo, e non recco alcun danno. Alla mattina seguente 2.d [2 detto] molti si recarono in quei campi dove avevano veduto a cadere quelle fiamme, e trovarono molti pezzi grandi, e piccoli di una certa materia a somiglianza della spuma che fa il Ferro nelle fucine dei Fabbri. Tale materia né fu portata a Bologna, e messa nella specola a perpetua memoria, come ancora il nostro reverendissimo sig. Arciprete D. [don] Giacomo Bergamaschi, e reverendissimo sig. D. [don] Giovanni Pasqualini né comprarono un pezzetto per ciascheduno per farne anch'essi di tale Accaduto memoria.

(At the 8th hour of the afternoon of the first day of January here in Cento a flash of lightning arose which melted into a gentle rain, but this was discharged in the Renazzo community three miles away from Cento it fell in various fields like a rain of fire that brings scare for everyone who saw the spectacle, but thank God it didn't last long, and didn't cause any harm. The following morning 2.d [said 2] many went to those fields where they had seen those flames falling, and found many large and small pieces of a certain material similar to the foam that the iron makes in the blacksmiths' forges. This matter was brought to Bologna and placed in the observatory as a perpetual memorial, as our most reverend Mr. Archpriest D. [don] Giacomo Bergamaschi, and most reverend Mr. D. [Don] Giovanni Pasqualini bought a piece each to make a memorial of this event.)

=== Original chronicle by Sebastiano Lenzi ===
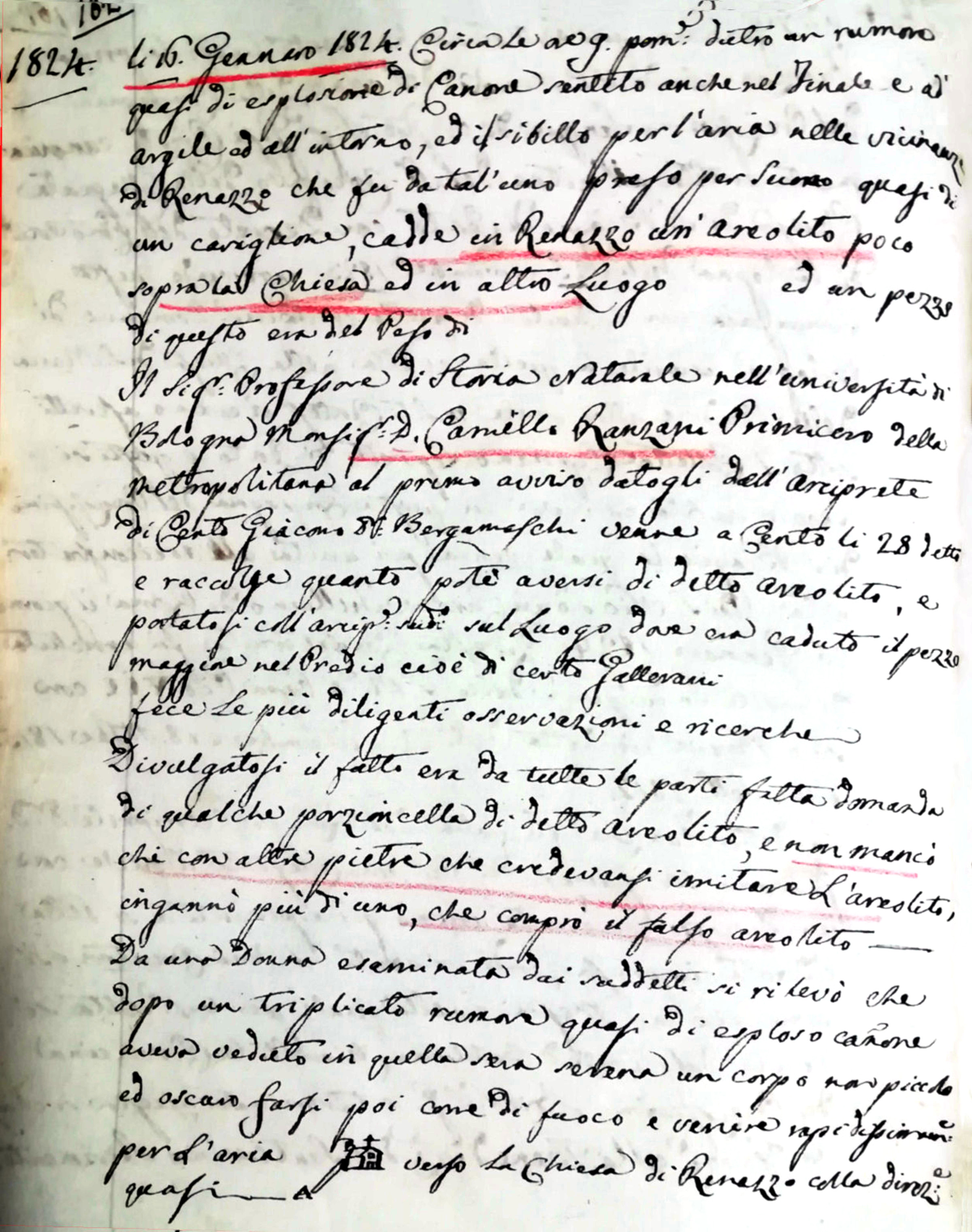
Renazzo Meteorite - Chronicle by Lenzi

Lì 16 Gennaio 1824. Circa alle ore 9 pom. [pomeridiane] 50 dietro un rumore quasi di esplosione di Canone sentito anche nel Finale e ad argile ed all’intorno, ed il sibilo per l’aria nelle vicinanze di Renazzo che fu da tal’uno preso per suono quasi di un caviglione/cariglione, cadde in Renazzo un’areolito poco sopra la Chiesa ed in altro luogo [spazio vuoto] ed un pezzo di questo era del peso di. il Sig. Professore di Storia Naturale nell’Università di Bologna Monsig. D. Camillo Ranzani Primicerio della metropolitana al primo avviso datogli dall’arciprete di Cento Giacomo M. Bergamaschi venne a Cento il 28 detto e raccolse quanto poté aversi di detto areolito, e portatosi coll’arciprete sul luogo dove era caduto il pezzo maggiore nel predio di un certo Gallerani fece le più diligenti osservazioni e ricerche. Divulgatosi il fatto era da tutte le parti fatta domanda di qualche porzioncella di detto areolito, e non mancò chi con altre pietre che credevansi imitare l’areolito ingannò più di uno che comprò il falso areolito. Da una donna esaminata dai suddetti si rilevò che dopo un triplicato rumore quasi di esploso cannone aveva veduto in quella sera serena un corpo non piccolo ed oscuro farsi poi come di fuoco e venire rapidamente per l’aria verso la Chiesa di Renazzo colla direzione quasi.

(January 16, 1824. Around 9 pm. [afternoon] 50 behind a noise almost like an explosion of a cannon also heard in Finale and in Argile and around them, and the hiss in the air in the vicinity of Renazzo which was taken by some to be the sound almost of a cariglione, an areolite fell in Renazzo just above the Church and in another place [empty space] and a piece of this was of the weight of. Mr. Professor of Natural History at the University of Bologna Monsig. D. Camillo Ranzani Primicerio of the metropolitan church came to Cento at the first notice given to him by the archpriest of Cento Giacomo M. Bergamaschi on the 28th and collected what he could of the said areolite, and went with the archpriest to the place where the largest piece had fallen into the grave made the most diligent observations and research on a certain Gallerani. Once the fact became known, requests were made everywhere for some portion of the said areolite, and there was no shortage of people who deceived more than one person who bought the fake areolite with other stones believed to imitate the areolite. From a woman examined by the aforementioned it was noted that after a triple noise almost like a cannon exploding she had seen on that clear evening a rather small and dark body then appear as if it were on fire and come rapidly through the air towards the Church of Renazzo with the direction almost.)

The impact point of the three main fragments was not recorded in documents of the time. Following the research conducted by Thomas Mazzi, in 2023 it was possible to reconstruct the event and find the site of the fall with precision. Other research on the exact date of the fall and the exact mass recovered is still underway.

== See also ==
- Glossary of meteoritics
- Carbonaceous chondrite
