= Italy Between the Arts and Sciences =

Mural by Mario Sironi

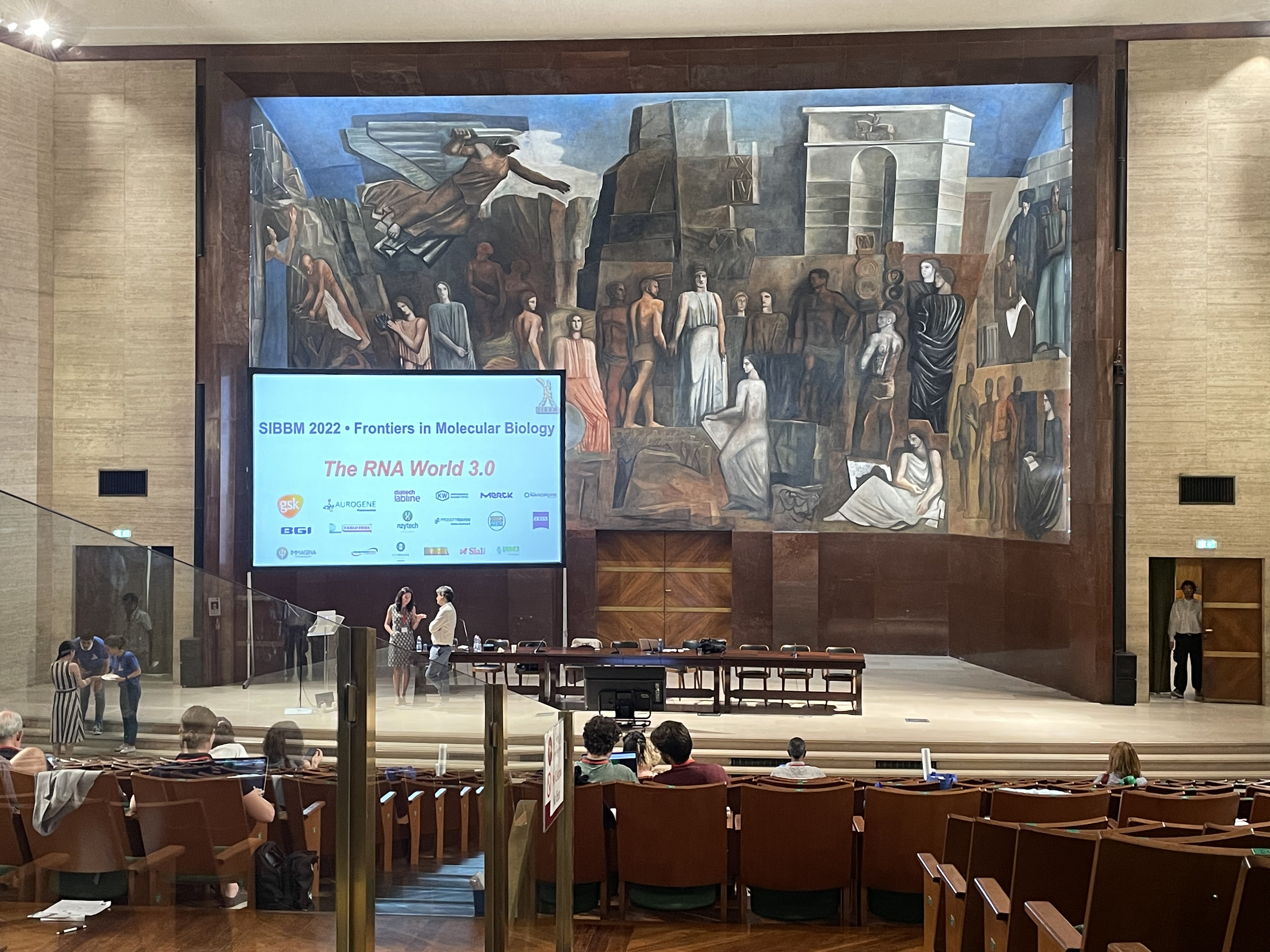
Mario Sironi, Italy Between the Arts and Sciences, 1935

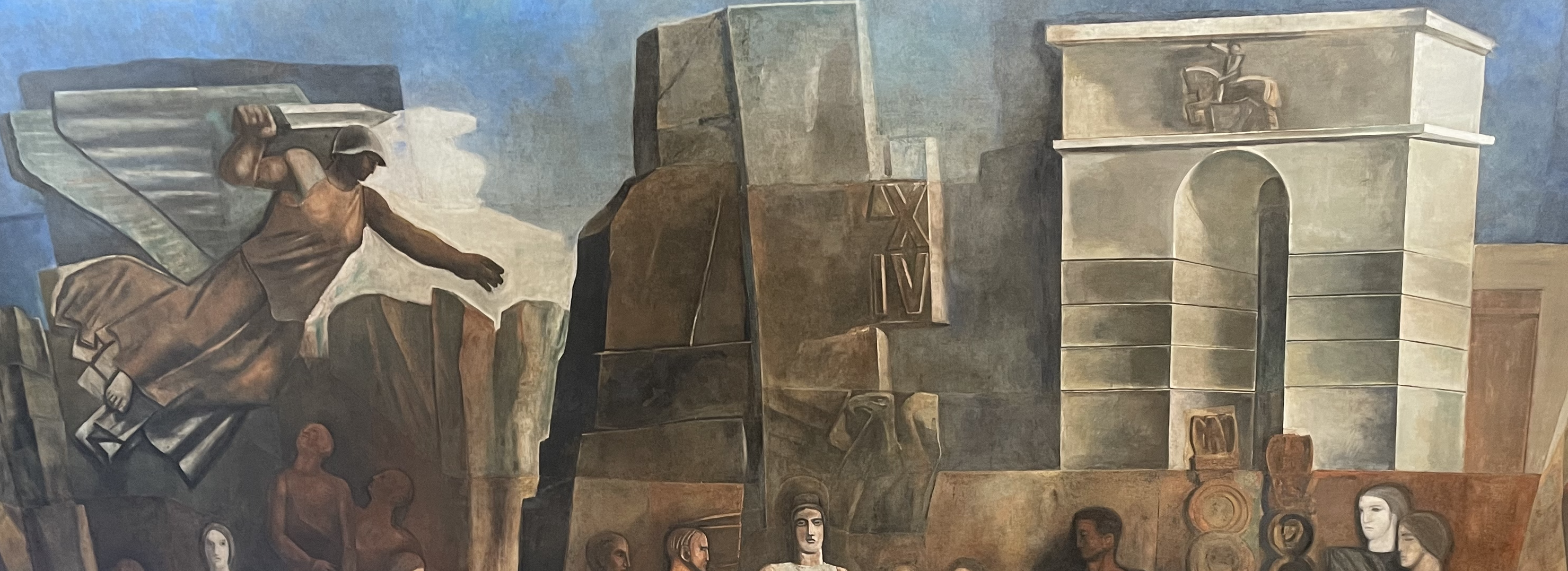
Detail showing the restored Fascist iconography

Italy Between the Arts and Sciences is a mural from 1935 created by the Italian modernist painter Mario Sironi. It forms the backdrop to the stage in the Great Hall of Sapienza University of Rome. Combining elements of both classical and modernist art, the mural depicts a central figure of Italy portrayed as a goddess at war, flanked by allegorical figures representing the arts and sciences: Astronomy, Mineralogy, Botany, Geography, Architecture, Letters, Painting, and History.

The mural went through a series of changes due to its association with fascism. In 1950, the fresco was repainted, covering up fascist symbols. A restoration project in 2015 removed the overpainting, revealing the original iconography.

== Background ==
Mussolini's Fascist regime sought to use art to deliver clear, didactic messages. Murals played an important role in achieving this goal because of their visibility to a broad public.

Sironi had established a reputation as an artist who used the formal experimentation of Italian modernism to explore themes of national identity and heritage that aligned with Italian Fascism.

Combining classical traditions of Italian art with elements of modernism, this 8-meter by 17-meter mural used both traditional fresco techniques and modern, industrial materials such as iron and cement.

The imagery of the allegorical figures representing the arts and sciences in the mural was intended to celebrate the achievements of the Fascist state.

== Debate ==
After World War II, the mural prompted debate because of its associations with Fascism. Scholars recognize the historical significance of Sironi's work as a product of the effort to create a distinctly modern Italian art during the 1930s. On the other hand, scholars have argued that "'heritagizing' fascism's monumental remains offers uncritical legitimation and the valorization of a deeply troubling past."

In 2015, Sapienza University and the Central Institute of Restoration (Istituto Centrale per il Restauro) began work to restore the mural to its original appearance. The work was completed in 2017. The project was widely celebrated in the Italian press, and most commentators described any effort to cover the Fascist symbols as vandalism. Marina Righetti, a professor at Sapienza and one of the managers of the restoration, stated that any political controversy over the Fascist symbols would come from people who are "strangers to culture and do not understand the value of recovering a foundational artist of the twentieth century."
