= Ignazio Villa =

Italian sculptor

Ignazio Villa (1813, Milan—1895, Rome) was an Italian sculptor of mainly mythologic and sacred scenes, as well as portraits.

== Career ==
Villa painted near-life size historical or mythologic tableaux. For example, he painted a 3/4 size group representing Diomede che precipita Pantasilea nello Scamandro. Among other works are the Toilette of Venus, and the statue semicolossale depicting: Archimedes Burning the Ships of Marcellus with Concave Mirrors exhibited in 1872 at Milan, along with La sera che indica ai popoli il riposo, il silenzio e la calma. In 1884 at Turin, he exhibited an equestrian group, depicting: Una lotta; and a marble statue: The discovery of Archimedes. Other works of Villa are: L'Aurora che sveglia i popoli dal sonno; Hagar heals Samuel, and other statues of biblical and mythologic themes. A neogothic house apparently designed by him in central Florence was Palazzo Villa on Via Il Prato 22 corner via Santa Lucia. His grandson, Mario Sironi, (1885-1961) was an artist.

He was made a knight of the Order of the Crown of Italy and Academic of Merit by many academies and institutes of art in Italy.
