= Museum of Pasta =

Italian ethnographic museum

Coordinates: 44°44′26.6″N 10°10′26.9″E

The Museum of Pasta (in Italian Museo della pasta) is an Italian ethnographic museum dedicated to pasta. It is located in Corte di Giarola, between Collecchio and Ozzano Taro, in the Province of Parma, a region historically dedicated to the production and processing of pasta. The museum shares space with the Museum of Tomato (in Italian Museo del pomodoro).

== History ==
In 2001, the Comitato Promotore dei Musei del Cibo (literally the Promoting Committee of Food Museums) was founded. Starting 2003 and 2004, it cooperated with the Association of the Food Museums of the Province of Parma, that had brought together the Province of Parma, the Communes of Soragna, Langhirano and Collecchio, a consortium of protectionists of typical food products, the Chamber of Commerce of Parma and various economic associations, all interested in the creation and management of a network of Food Museums in the province of Parma. This resulted in launching of an initiative to establish a museum in Corte di Giarola, a public building, and a great medieval rural court, as a museum dedicated to the tomato. It shares space with an adjoining Museum of Tomato (in Italian Museo del pomodoro).

== Opening ==
The Museum of Pasta is located on the ground floor of the west wing of Corte di Giarola that was renovated. It was earlier a centre for processing agricultural food products dating back to the medieval times until the end of the 19th century, later a processing industry for conserve and food in for the first six decades of the 20th century. The museum was inaugurated on May 10, 2014 coinciding with a conference with a convention dedicated to "La pasta tra storia, cultura e gastronomia" (meaning "Pasta: history, culture and gastronomy") with invitees collector Ettore Guatelli, poet Attilio Bertolucci and entrepreneur Pietro Barilla, the Italian coordinator of the Food Museums and famous food journalist Davide Paolini.

== Exhibits ==
The exhibition halls of the Museum of Pasta are divided into six sections. The first section, describes through a series of panels and documents, models and vintage farming tools and the historical evolution of grain and cereal cultivation techniques. The second hall illustrates, through panels, models, and the reconstruction of a mill the historical evolution of grinding techniques and the third hall bread and bakery products. The fourth hall illustrates, through a collection of small household utensils of the past, homemade pasta preparation techniques and various sizes of pasta. The fifth hall has a replica of an industrial pasta factory dating back to the early 19th century and some ancient machinery, the techniques of industrial pasta manufacturing and the methods of forming its more than hundred types. Finally the sixth hall illustrates, through panels, postcards, advertising leaflets, objects, paintings, stamps and catalogs, the rich culture of pasta in Italy.
