= Museum of Tomato =

Italian cultural museum

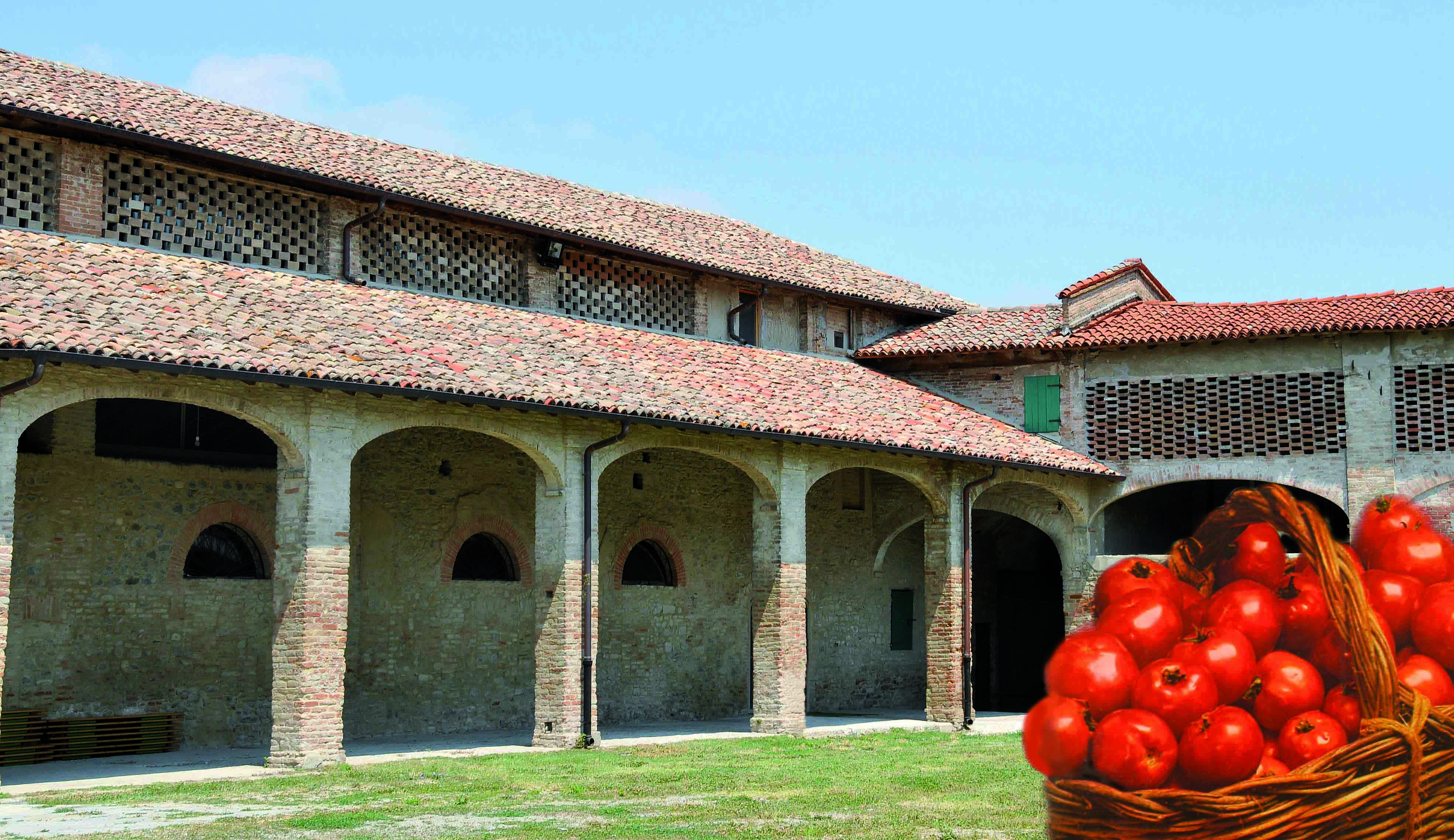
Tomato Museum in Corte di Giarola

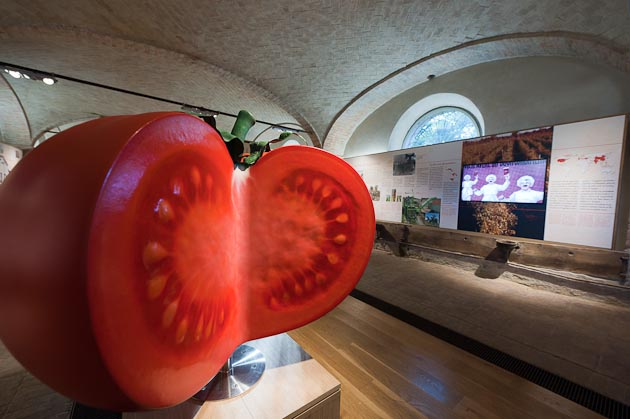
Entrance Hall of the Tomato Museum

The Museum of Tomato (in Italian Museo del pomodoro) is an Italian ethnographic museum dedicated to the tomato. It is located in Corte di Giarola, between Collecchio and Ozzano Taro, in the Province of Parma, a region historically dedicated to the production and processing of tomatoes. The museum shares space with the Museum of Pasta (in Italian della pasta).

== History ==
In 2001, the Comitato Promotore dei Musei del Cibo (literally the Promoting Committee of Food Museums) was founded. Starting 2003 and 2004, it cooperated with the Association of the Food Museums of the Province of Parma, that had brought together the Province of Parma, the Communes of Soragna, Langhirano and Collecchio, a consortium of protectionists of typical food products, the Chamber of Commerce of Parma and various economic associations, all interested in the creation and management of a network of Food Museums in the province of Parma. This resulted in launching of an initiative to establish a museum in Corte di Giarola, a public building, and a great medieval rural court, as a museum dedicated to the tomato. It shares space with an adjoining Museum of Pasta (in Italian Museo della pasta).

== Opening ==
The Tomato Museum is located on the ground floor of the west wing of Corte di Giarola that was renovated. It was earlier a centre for processing agricultural food products dating back to the medieval times until the end of the 19th century, later a processing industry for conserve and food in for the first six decades of the 20th century. The museum was inaugurated on September 25, 2010 coinciding with a conference with a convention dedicated to "Il pomodoro a Parma: storia, imprenditorialità e gusto" (meaning "Tomato in Parma: history, entrepreneurship and taste") with invitees Tullio Gregory, the director of the Istituto dell'Enciclopedia Italiana, the nutritionist Giorgio Calabrese, Giancarlo Gonizzi, the Italian coordinator of the Food Museums and famous food journalist Davide Paolini.

== Exhibition halls ==
The exhibition halls of the Museum of Tomato are divided into seven sections. The first section, is characterized by the presence of a large central sculpture depicting a cut tomato, and through a series of panels, descriptions of the many existing tomato varieties, the history of its arrival in Europe from the American continent. The second hall illustrates, through some historical images and objects, the development of the tomato processing industry in Parma region, whereas the third hall displays 14 vintage machinery, describing the development of tomato production technologies, whereas the fourth hall describes the production process, the finished product and packaging. The fifth hall illustrates through some panels, the development of the tomato mechanical industry, and sixth hall illustrates, through pictures and panels, the pioneers of the industry and production facilities of well-established factories. Finally the seventh hall describes, through panels, postcards, advertising brochures, and catalogs, the rich culture of the "Pomodoro World".

== Sources ==
- Mariagrazia Villa, "Il Museo del Pomodoro", in Parma economica, nº 1, Parma, Camera di Commercio di Parma, 2010.
