= Porta San Donato, Bologna =

Coordinates: 44°29′54″N 11°21′22″E

Porta San Donato, also known as Porta Zamboni, was a gate or portal of the former outer medieval walls of the city of Bologna, Italy. It was a gate into the university area of the city.

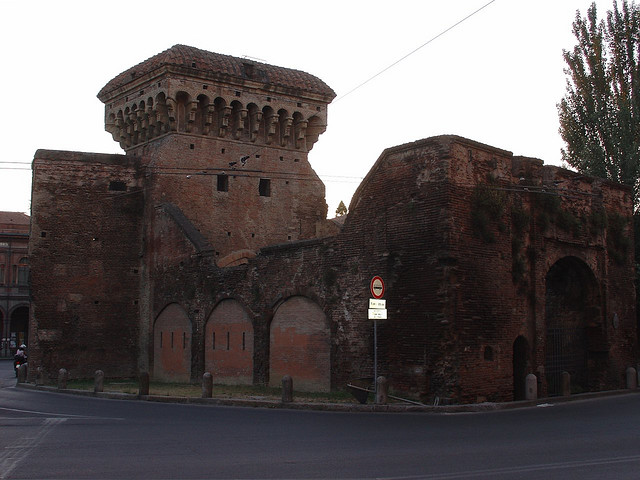
Porta San Donato (before Restoration in 2008–2009)

The gate was built in the 13th century, and by 1354 was equipped with a drawbridge. It was sealed in 1428, but reopened in the following decades. It is flanked by a machiocolated tower.
