= Palazzo Santa Margherita =

Coordinates: 44.6472°N 10.9309°E

Palazzo Santa Margherita, Modena

The Palazzo Santa Margherita is a Neoclassical-style palace located on Corso Canalgrande #103 in the central Modena region of Emilia-Romagna in Italy.

A convent had been present at the site, dedicated to Santa Margherita of Cortona. The structures were refurbished circa 1830 under the Austrian administration, incorporating a church and buildings which served as a school for orphans. The exterior facade was designed by Francesco Vandelli.

The building now houses a series of civic museums, including the Galleria Civica di Modena and the Museo della figurina, as well as the Istituto Musicale Orazio Vecchi and the public library Biblioteca Delfini. In 1995, the civic gallery was moved to this building. Since 1983, another hall for exhibitions has been the nearby Palazzina dei Giardini: formerly a hunting casino, in the gardens of the Ducal Palace of Modena. The civic gallery mainly displays collections of photography and contemporary art. Among the artists with works in the museum are Filippo de Pisis, Mario Mafai, Mario Sironi, Ennio Morlotti, Giorgio Morandi, and Luigi Fontana.
