= Museo della figurina =

Collectible card museum in Modena, Italy

Collectible Card Museum
- Museo della figurina
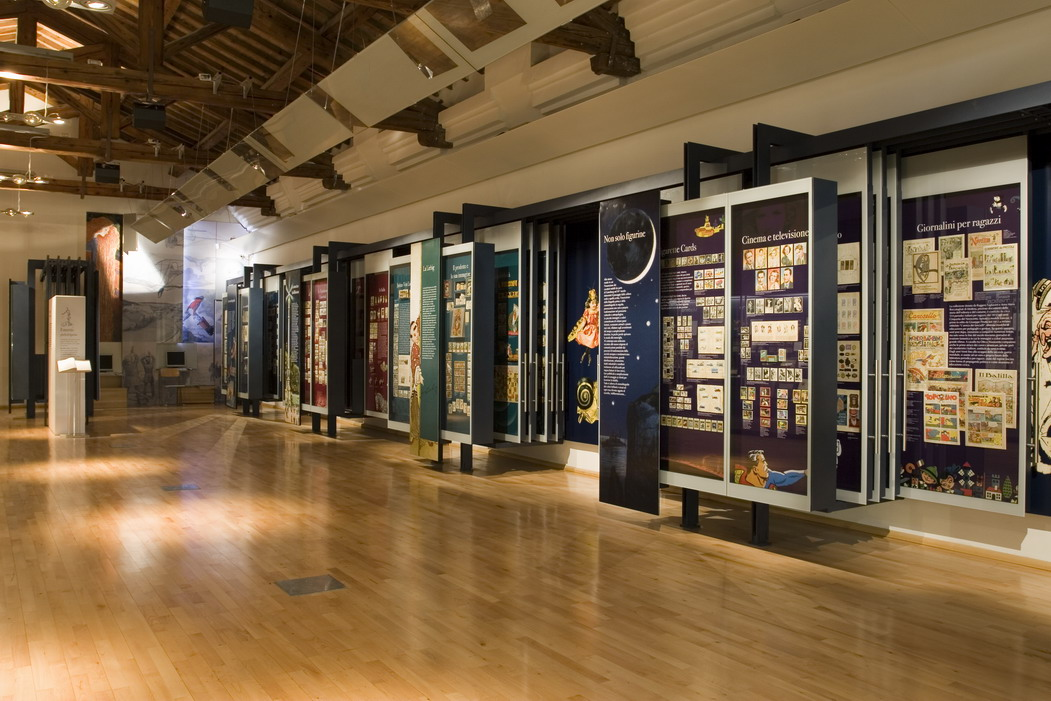
- Former name: Collezione Panini
- Established: 15 December 2006
- Location: Palazzo Santa Margherita, Modena, Italy
- Collections: Collectible cards
- Collection size: 500,000
- Founder: Giuseppe Panini
- Owner: City of Modena
- Website: www.comune.modena.it/museofigurina

The Museo della figurina (Collectible Card Museum) is a museum dedicated to collectible cards. Opened on December 15, 2006, it is located inside Palazzo Santa Margherita, in Modena, Italy.

== History ==
The Collectible cards museum was born for the collector's will and passion by Giuseppe Panini, the founder of the Panini Group and the creator of the renewal of the collectible cards in the modern sense, who wanted to support his product through a small print story gathering, since the beginning of his business, hundreds of thousands of small prints from all over the world, similar to the figurine for technique or function.

The collection expanded to such an extent as to become, in 1986, a museum located within the company itself. In 1992 Giuseppe Panini decided, in agreement with the company and the Municipality of Modena, to donate the collection, which has become one of the most important in the world in its city, the world's capital of the collectible cards, a museum that could document its origins and development to the most modern production techniques.

Over the years to follow, the museum's activities focused on the cataloging of the collection, consisting of about 500,000 cards, on its expansion and its dissemination through publications and thematic exhibitions.

== The rooms ==
The layout includes a permanent section divided into the following main areas:

- The antecedents: recurring iconographic themes;
- Chromolithography: the advent of chromolithographic printing and the path from the sketch to the card;
- The birth and spread: from the dawn of the card in the second half of the nineteenth century in France until the prizes in Italy in the thirties of the twentieth century;
- Liebig: the world's most famous collection of cards;
- Not just collectible cards: barber calendar, cigarette cards, placemarks, menus, sealing stamps, hotel labels and other smaller collections;
- The modern collectible cards: the cards dedicated to the world of sport, especially to football, and the spread of albums in the post-war period.

The museum is set up in a large exhibition hall, where there are six cabinets, corresponding to six large albums to browse. In them, the whole story of cards has been traced back to the most innovative production techniques. Each wardrobe corresponds to a precise path, marked by original prints and objects, for a total of 2,500 pieces, which are part of the museum's heritage (about 500,000 cards in total). In addition to the real cards that represent the main part of the collection, Giuseppe Panini wanted to represent the whole world of small color prints: English cigarettes cards, cigar cords, boxes matches, menus and hotel labels, candy papers, barber calendar, and 80,000 stamp stamps.

For the exhibition purpose, the Museum usually organizes temporary exhibitions, which propose a specific theme. There is also a workshop for didactic activities and a specialized library in the Museum.

== See also ==
- Panini Group
