= Corte di Giarola =

Corte di Giarola (meaning court of Giarola) is an Italian medieval rural court with an inner church, located in the village of Pontescodogna, part of commune of Collecchio, in the province of Parma. Corte di Giarola is presently a multi-purpose facility. It includes the headquarters of the Ente di Gestione per i Parchi (meaning the Park Management Authority) and Biodiversità Emilia Occidentale. It also hosts the Museum of Tomato (in Italian Museo del pomodoro), the . (in Italian Museo della pasta) being part of Museum of Food (Musei del cibo), the Museo Sotto il segno dell'Acqua which is an exhibition trail dedicated to the Taro River Regional Park, in addition to small 99-seat theatre called Teatro alla Corte, plus an auditorium hall, two conference rooms and a restaurant.

The complex originally contained the church Chiesa di San Nicomede, located in the southwest corner of the court. Now the complex retains just a few portions of the exterior wall of the original Romanesque structure, decorated with a motif with Lombard bands; the interior, covered by a ceiling in wooden beams rebuilt after the bombings of World War II, displays some valuable works dating back to the 17th and 18th centuries.

== History ==
The court was originally built between the 8th and 9th centuries by the order of Ingo, a nobleman; the building served as location for a fortified garrison on a nearby ford of a branch of River Taro. Because of its proximity to the watercourse, it was known by the name of Glarola, probably of Latin origin, in reference to the large amount of gravel deposited on the banks of the river.

The region's feudal lordship gave the building in 1034 AD to the monastery of San Paulo in Parma. The monastery turned it into an independent agricultural court, protected by walls and equipped with houses, stables, dairy and mill powered by the waters of the Naviglio canal; the wooded and swampy surrounding lands were reclaimed and cultivated.

In 1187, Pope Gregory VIII issued a papal bull confirming the rights to the court and to the Romanesque church dedicated to St Nicomede (Chiesa di San Nicomede) and the adjoining chapel as part of the administration of San Prospero di Collecchio church. To defend the building and the ford, the bishop of Parma also erected a defensive tower, as an extension of his defensive effort of the nearby castles of Collecchio, Segalara, Madregolo and Carona.

The structure was acquired by the Rossi but was largely destroyed by the Parmesans in 1308. From 1440 the fortified structures were almost completely demolished or converted into dwellings. According to the Catasto farnesiano of 1562, the court house, now dependent on the Parma magistrate inhabited 110 people, ran an area of 1140 Parmesan biolines (corresponding to approximately 342 hectares of land), largely belonging to the monastery of San Paulo; the cultivations extended particularly in the western plain, as the river Taro flowed far more westward at that time.

In 1760, the Romanesque church was modified with a neoclassical style. After the Napoleonic conquest of the Duchy of Parma and Piacenza, the court remained subject to the Commune of Parma for some years, but in 1806 it was incorporated with that of Collecchio. Following the suppression of the religious orders that affected the Benedictines of the San Paulo monastery, in 1811 the estate was confiscated by the French government and rented out to agricultural entrepreneurs, notably Camillo and Alessandro Zileri. The inhabitants of the resort had reportedly reached 312 in 1855, to decrease slightly in the following decades. The lands were subdivided and privatized, while the court itself was purchased at the end of the 19th century by the Montagna family, who dedicated part of the surrounding land to tomato cultivation and built adjacent a preserved factory and a modern dairy with attached breeding of pigs, leased to external conductors. Gradually the old structures deteriorated, while the canning industry was expanded by the renters after the 1930s.

During World War II, on April 17, 1945, the court was hit by the bombings of Allied aircraft, which caused the death of nine people and the partial collapse of the church (Chiesa di San Nicomede), of which only a few portions of the external walls survived; the place of worship was rebuilt in 1950 in the original Romanesque forms.

The food factory taken over in 1957 by the entrepreneur Ercole Azzali; a few years later, however, it was closed, followed by the dairy factory. After the cessation of production activity, the complex's degradation increased, until in 1998 the court and the annexed structures were purchased by Ente Parco Fluviale Regionale del Taro, then the Ente di Gestione per i Parchi (Park Management Authority) and the Biodiversità Emilia Occidentale. The new owners started the renovation works, using part of the building as their headquarters; the east wing was provided with exhibition and auditorium halls. In 2005, the farmhouse was restored, becoming an exhibit of a historic laboratory. In 2006, with additional financing of the region of Emilia-Romagna, the Collecchio Municipality and the Cariparma Foundation, the south wing, originally used as a woodcutting and storage facility, was transformed into a theatrical theater; Teatro alla Corte (The Court Theater) was inaugurated in September 2007. In the same year, the west wing renovations were started, originally the ancient stables. The Museum of Tomato was inaugurated on the wing in 2010. Further renovations in the west wing yard serving earlier as a pasta factory and a mill followed and mill; and in 2014, the renovated areas became the home of the Museum of Pasta with both tomato and pasta museums as part of the Musei del cibo (the food museum). In 2014, the roof of the church of San Nicomede was also rebuilt. It serves as a parish house serving the hamlet of Pontescodogna.

== Sources ==
- Infoturismo, in GuidaPiù, Collecchio, Reggio Emilia, Gruppo GuidaPiù srl, 2007.
- Tiziano Marcheselli, Collecchio di una volta, Parma, Gazzetta di Parma Editions, 2008.
