= Nicol prism =

Optical polarizer made of two birefrengent calcite crystals

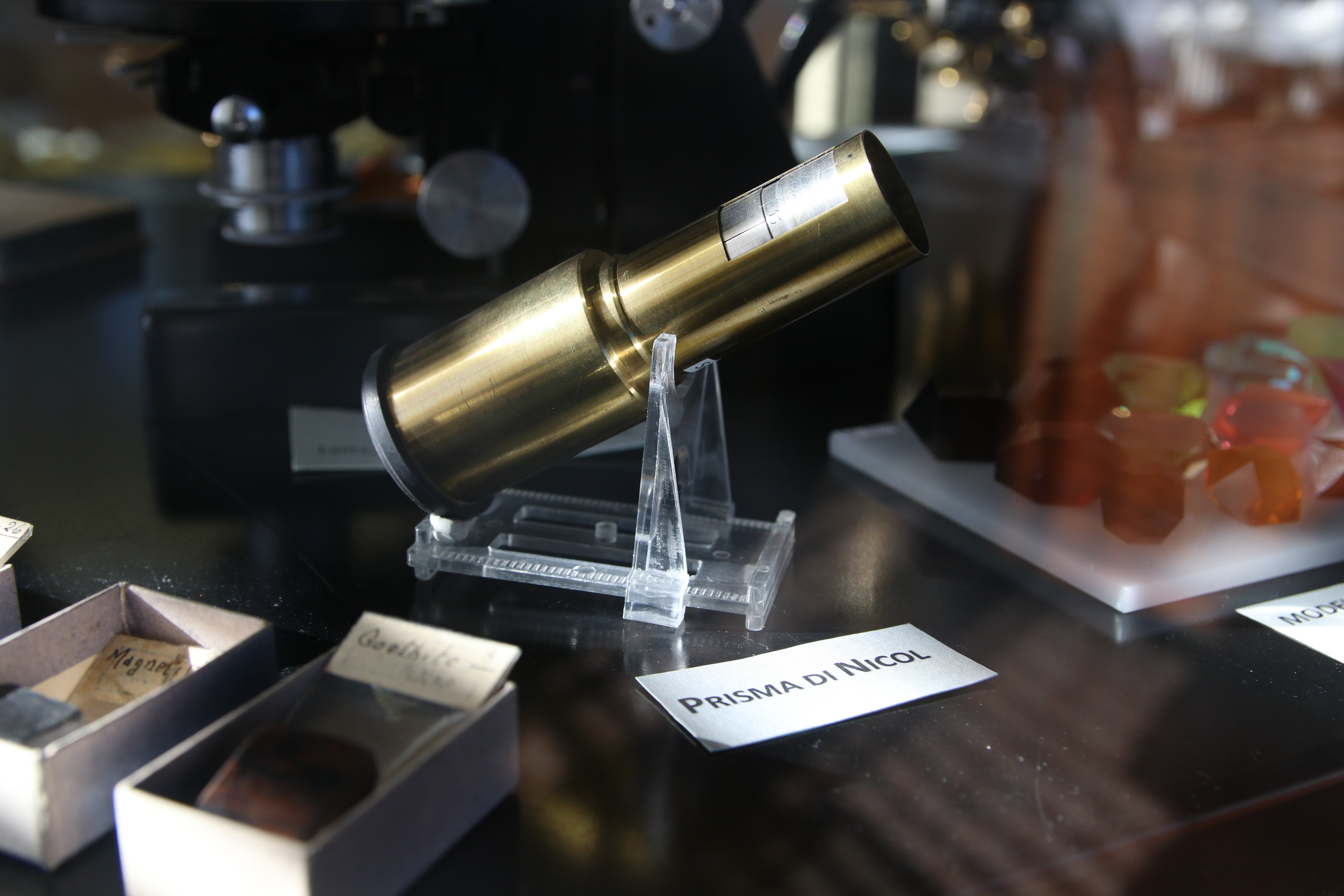
Nicol prism at the Mineralogical Collection "Luigi Bombicci Museum" of the University of Bologna, in Bologna

Schematic representation of the propagation of light in a Nicol prism showing the splitting of unpolarized light into ordinary and extraordinary polarized rays

A Nicol prism is a type of polarizer. It is an optical device made from calcite crystal used to convert ordinary light into plane polarized light. It is made in such a way that it eliminates one of the rays by total internal reflection, i.e. the ordinary ray is eliminated and only the extraordinary ray is transmitted through the prism.

It was the first type of polarizing prism, invented in 1828 by William Nicol (1770–1851) of Edinburgh.

== Mechanism ==
The Nicol prism consists of a rhombohedral crystal of Iceland spar (a variety of calcite) that has been cut at an angle of 68° with respect to the crystal axis, cut again diagonally, and then rejoined, using a layer of transparent Canada balsam as a glue.

Unpolarized light ray enters through the side face of the crystal, and is split into two orthogonally polarized, differently directed rays by the birefringence property of calcite. The ordinary ray, or o-ray, experiences a refractive index of n_{o} = 1.658 in the calcite and undergoes a total internal reflection at the calcite–glue interface because of its angle of incidence at the glue layer (refractive index n = 1.550) exceeds the critical angle for the interface. It passes out the top side of the upper half of the prism with some refraction. The extraordinary ray, or e-ray, experiences a lower refractive index (n_{e} = 1.486) in the calcite crystal and is not totally reflected at the interface because it strikes the interface at a sub-critical angle. The e-ray merely undergoes a slight refraction, or bending, as it passes through the interface into the lower half of the prism. It finally leaves the prism as a ray of plane-polarized light, undergoing another refraction, as it exits the opposite side of the prism. The two exiting rays have polarizations orthogonal (at right angles) to each other, but the lower, or e-ray, is the more commonly used for further experimentation because it is again traveling in the original horizontal direction, assuming that the calcite prism angles have been properly cut. The direction of the upper ray, or o-ray, is quite different from its original direction because it alone suffers total internal reflection at the glue interface, as well as a final refraction on exit from the upper side of the prism.

== Uses ==
Nicol prisms were once widely used in mineralogical microscopy and polarimetry, and the term "using crossed Nicols" (abbreviated as XN) is still used to refer to the observing of a sample placed between orthogonally oriented polarizers.

In most instruments, however, Nicol prisms have been replaced by other types of polarizers such as polaroid sheets and Glan–Thompson prisms.
