= List of mineral tests =

Mineral tests are simple physical and chemical methods of testing samples, which can help to identify the mineral type. This approach is used widely in mineralogy, ore geology and general geological mapping.

The following tests are some examples of those that are used on hand specimens, or on field samples, or on thin sections with the aid of a polarizing microscope.

- Color

Color of the mineral. Color alone is not diagnostic. For example quartz can be almost any color, depending on minor impurities and microstructure.

- Streak

Color of the mineral's powder. This can be found by rubbing the mineral onto a concrete. This is more accurate but not always mineral specific.

- Lustre

This is the way light reflects from the mineral's surface. A mineral can be metallic (shiny) or non-metallic (not shiny).

- Transparency

The way light travels through minerals. The mineral can be transparent (clear), translucent (cloudy) or opaque (none).

- Specific gravity

Ratio between the weight of the mineral relative to an equal volume of water.

- Mineral habit

The shape of a single crystal and/or aggregate of multiple crystals of the same mineral.

- Magnetism

Magnetic or nonmagnetic. Can be tested by using a magnet or compass. While the most common magnetic minerals contain iron, many iron minerals are nonmagnetic. (for example, pyrite).

- Cleavage

The way a mineral splits (or “cleaves”), particularly along planes in the crystal structure. Cleavage is generally described by

  - how well a mineral can be split to produce a flat plane, a process controlled by planes of weakness in the crystal structure.
  - the number of distinct directions of these cleavage planes
  - the angles between those directions.
- UV fluorescence

Many minerals glow when put under a UV light.

- Radioactivity

Is the mineral radioactive or non-radioactive? This is measured by a Geiger counter or scintillation counter.

- Taste

This is not recommended. Is the mineral salty, bitter or does it have no taste? Taste is sometimes used by professionals to distinguish between specific, non-toxic minerals known to occur in a well-studied area without possible contaminants.

- Bite Test

This is not recommended. This involves biting a mineral to see if it’s generally soft or hard. This was used in early gold exploration to tell the difference between pyrite (fools gold, hard) and gold (soft). Several of the minerals where a bite test could be diagnostic contain heavy metals. Even gold can be toxic, with repeated ingestion or in impure form.

- Hardness

The Mohs Hardness Scale is the main scale to measure mineral hardness. Finger nail is 2.5, copper coin is 3.5, glass is 5.5 and steel is 6.5. Hardness scale is Talc is 1, Gypsum is 2, Calcite is 3, Fluorite is 4, Apatite is 5, Orthoclase Feldspar is 6, Quartz is 7, Topaz is 8, Corundum is 9 and Diamond is 10.

- Odor

Not always recommended. Does the mineral have an odor of oil, sulfur or something else or is there no odour?

- Electric resistance

Every mineral has a different electrical resistance which can be observed by passing an electric current through the mineral and measuring the resistance.

- Relief

Appearance of roughness, texture or thickness in optical mineralogy. This relief is caused by variations in refractive index of minerals.

- Fracture

Type of fracture and fracture pattern.

- Shape

Mineral shape or crystal system (cubic, tetragonal, hexagonal, trigonal, orthorhombic, monoclinic or triclinic)

- Birefringence

Colour of minerals in crossed polarized light (XPL), particularly notable in thin section. See also optical mineralogy.

- Twinning

Crystal twinning present and type.

- Extinction angle

Degrees which mineral turns black in XPL in microscope.

- Zoning

Mineral zoning present.

- Mineral texture

Porphyritic (large xenocryst surrounded by fine crystals), Melange (mix of minerals), Poikilitic (one mineral grown around another), Polymorph (same composition but different shape), Hetrogenous (many types of minerals), Homogeneous (one mineral type).

- Reactivity

Is the mineral reactive or nonreactive when exposed to other compounds? For example, minerals with calcium carbonate composition typically fizz when exposed to a weak acid.

- Associated rock type

With what rock type and/or other minerals is this mineral found?

- Degree of metamorphism and alteration

Mineral shape, properties or form been altered.

- Lattice structure and geochemistry

Signature chemical elements and bonds of the mineral. For example, is the mineral hydrous like mica or non hydrous like Jadeite.

== See also ==
- List of minerals
