= Microscope slide =

Thin, flat piece of glass onto which a sample is placed to be examined under a microscope

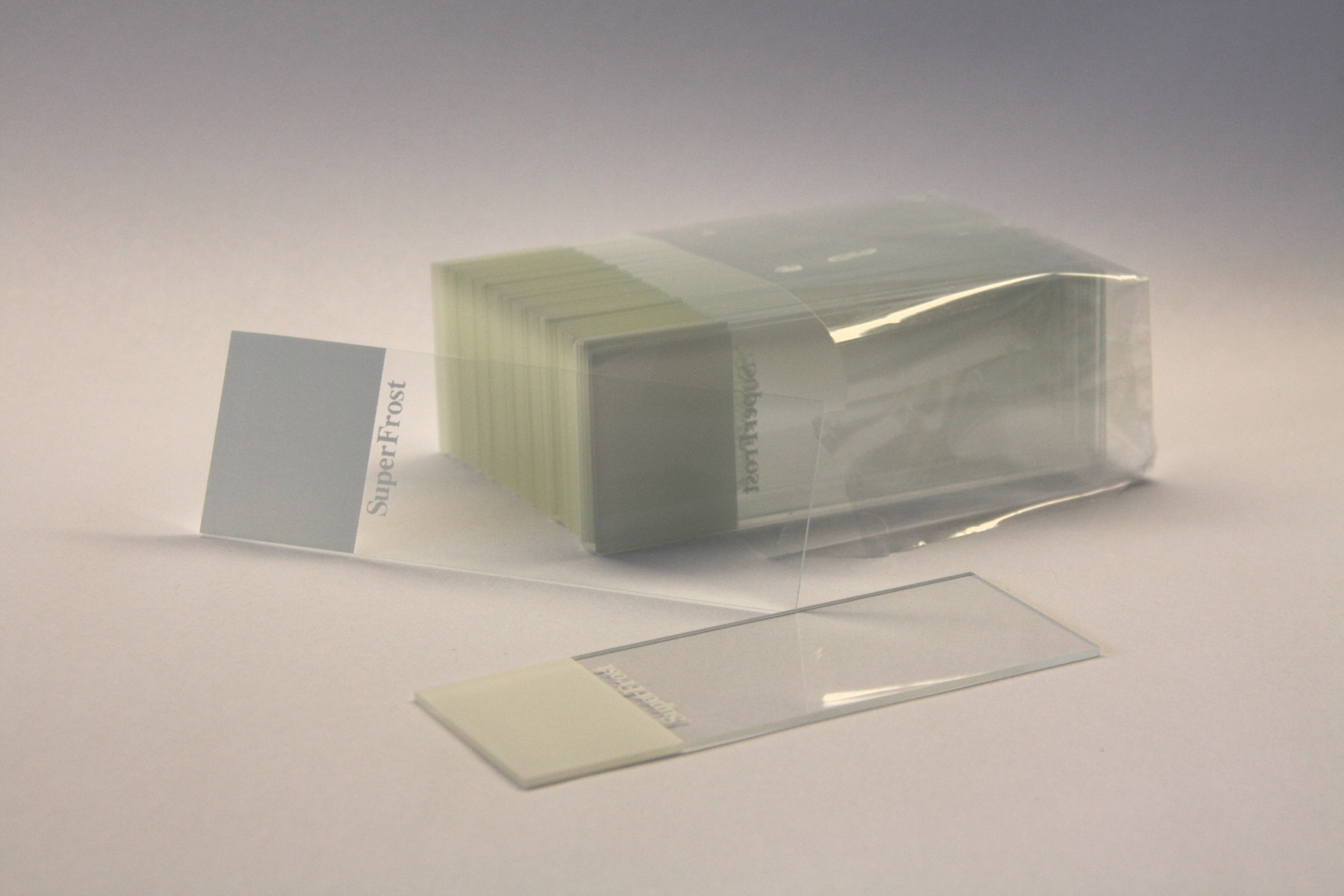
A set of standard 75 by 25 mm microscope slides. The white area can be written on to label the slide.

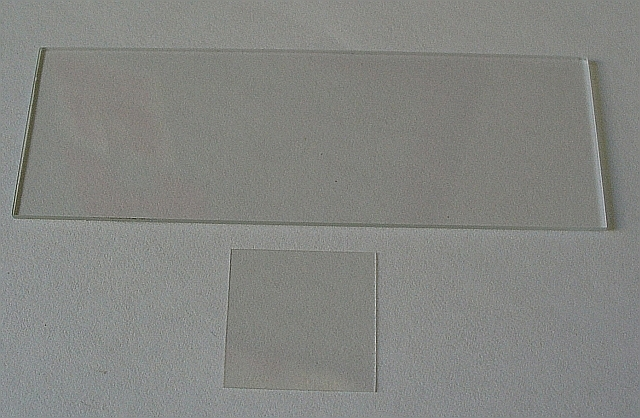
A microscope slide (top) and a cover slip (bottom)

A microscope slide is a thin flat piece of glass, typically 75 by 26 mm (3 by 1 inches) and about 1 mm thick, used to hold objects for examination under a microscope. Typically the object is mounted (secured) on the slide, and then both are inserted together in the microscope for viewing. This arrangement allows several slide-mounted objects to be quickly inserted and removed from the microscope, labeled, transported, and stored in appropriate slide cases or folders etc.

Microscope slides are often used together with a cover slip or cover glass, a smaller and thinner sheet of glass that is placed over the specimen. Slides are held in place on the microscope's stage by slide clips, slide clamps or a cross-table which is used to achieve precise, remote movement of the slide upon the microscope's stage (such as in an automated/computer operated system, or where touching the slide with fingers is inappropriate either due to the risk of contamination or lack of precision).

== History ==
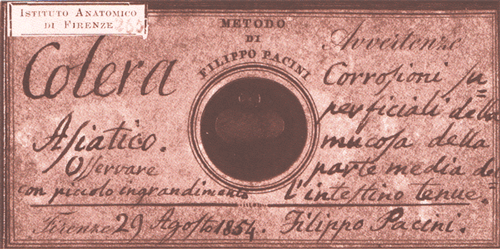
A microscope slide prepared in 1855 containing reference specimens from the inner mucosa of the small intestine of a cholera victim.

The origin of the concept was pieces of ivory or bone, containing specimens held between disks of transparent mica, that would slide into the gap between the stage and the objective. These "sliders" were popular in Victorian-era England until the Royal Microscopical Society introduced the standardized glass microscope slide.

== Dimensions and types ==
Common dimensions of microscope slides (in mm).

A standard microscope slide measures about 75 mm by 25 mm (3″ by 1″) and is about 1 mm thick. A range of other sizes are available for various special purposes, such as 75 x 50 mm for geological use, 46 x 27 mm for petrographic studies, and 48 x 28 mm for thin sections. Slides are usually made of common glass and their edges are often finely ground or polished.

Microscope slides are usually made of optical quality glass, such as soda lime glass or borosilicate glass, but specialty plastics are also used. Fused quartz slides are often used when ultraviolet transparency is important, e.g. in fluorescence microscopy.

While plain slides are the most common, there are several specialized types. A concavity slide or cavity slide has one or more shallow depressions ("wells"), designed to hold slightly thicker objects, and certain samples such as liquids and tissue cultures. Slides may have rounded corners for increased safety or robustness, or a cut-off corner for use with a slide clamp or cross-table, where the slide is secured by a spring-loaded curved arm contacting one corner, forcing the opposing corner of the slide against a right angled arm which does not move. If this system were used with a slide which did not incorporate these cut-off corners, the corners would chip and the slide could shatter.

A graticule slide is marked with a grid of lines (for example, a 1 mm grid) that allows the size of objects seen under magnification to be easily estimated and provides reference areas for counting minute objects. Sometimes one square of the grid will itself be subdivided into a finer grid. Slides for specialized applications, such as hemocytometers for cell counting, may have various reservoirs, channels and barriers etched or ground on their upper surface. Various permanent markings or masks may be printed, sand-blasted, or deposited on the surface by the manufacturer, usually with inert materials such as PTFE.

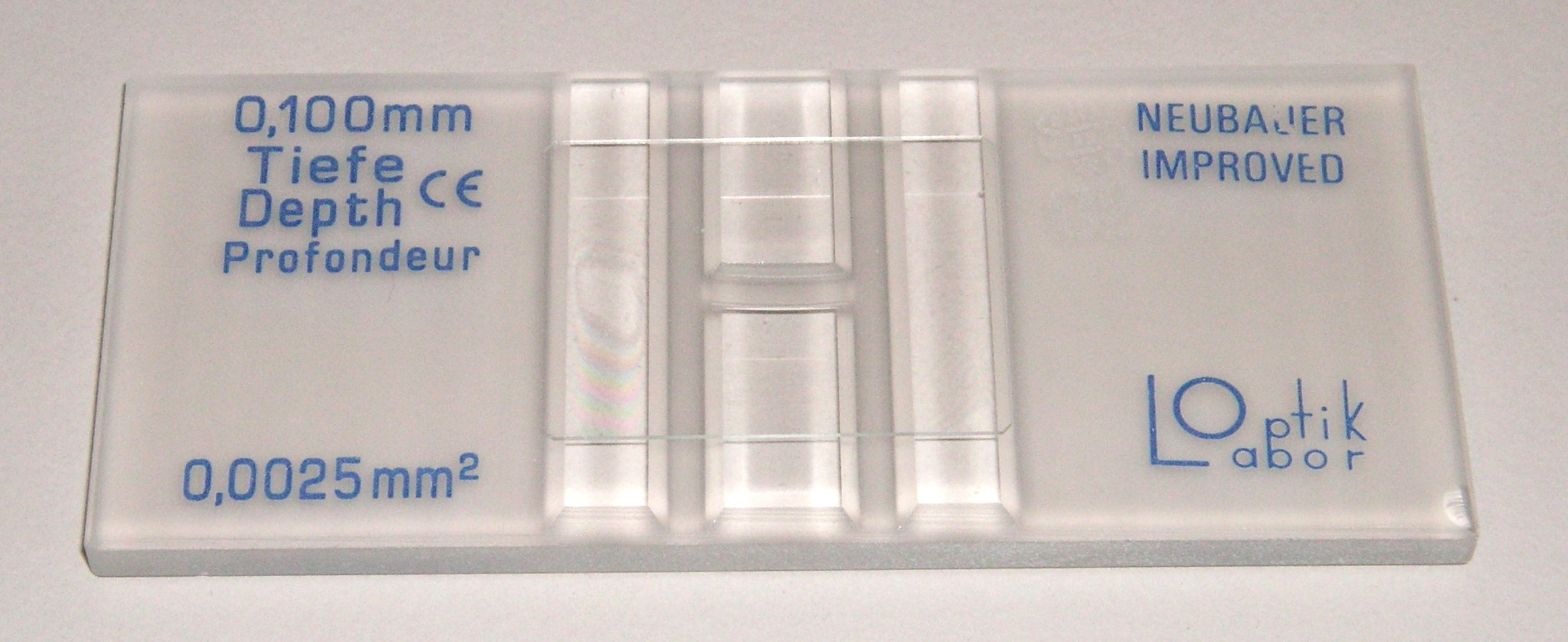
A Neubauer slide for cell counting.

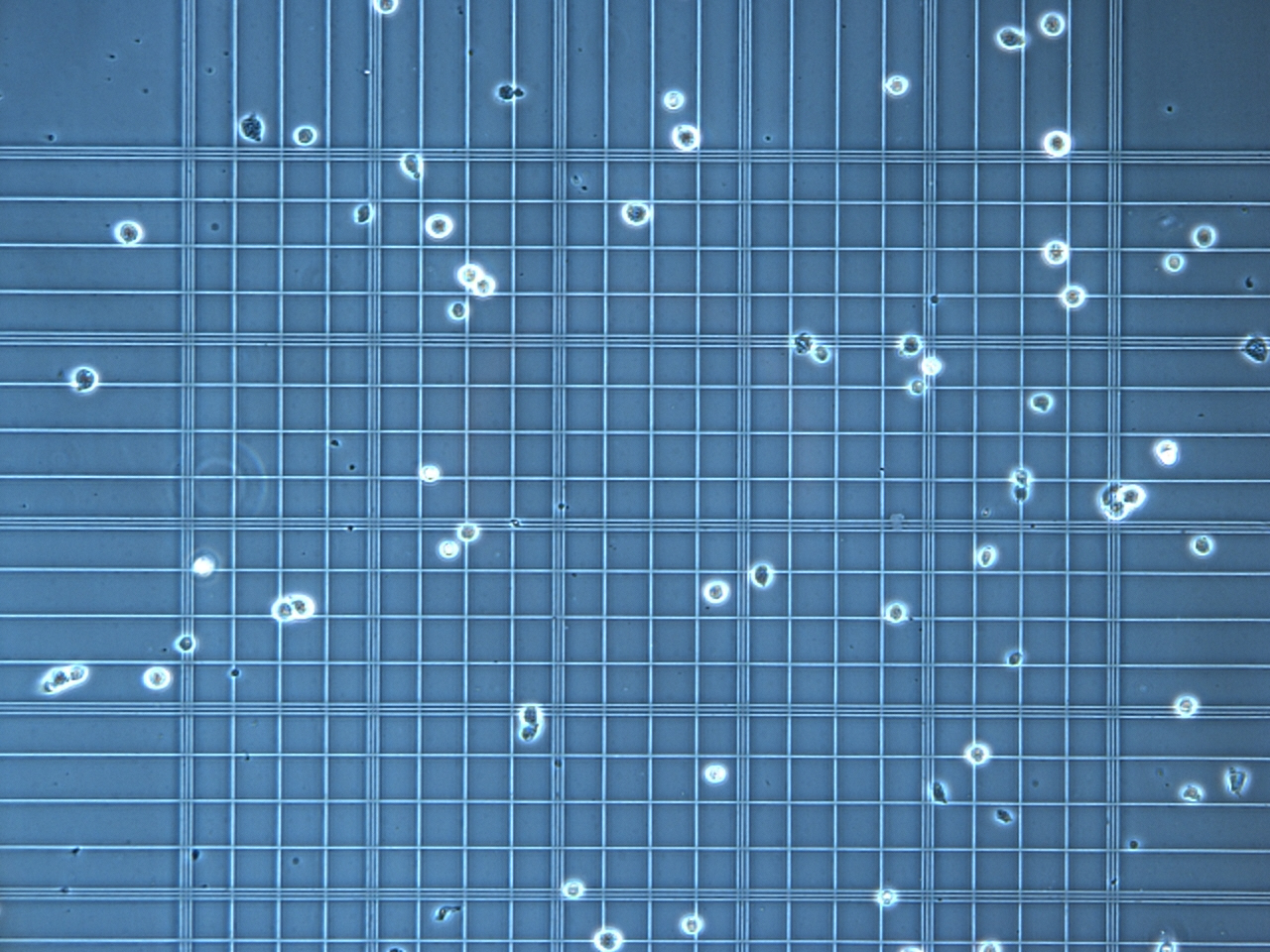
Microscope image of a Neubauer slide's graticule being used to count cells.

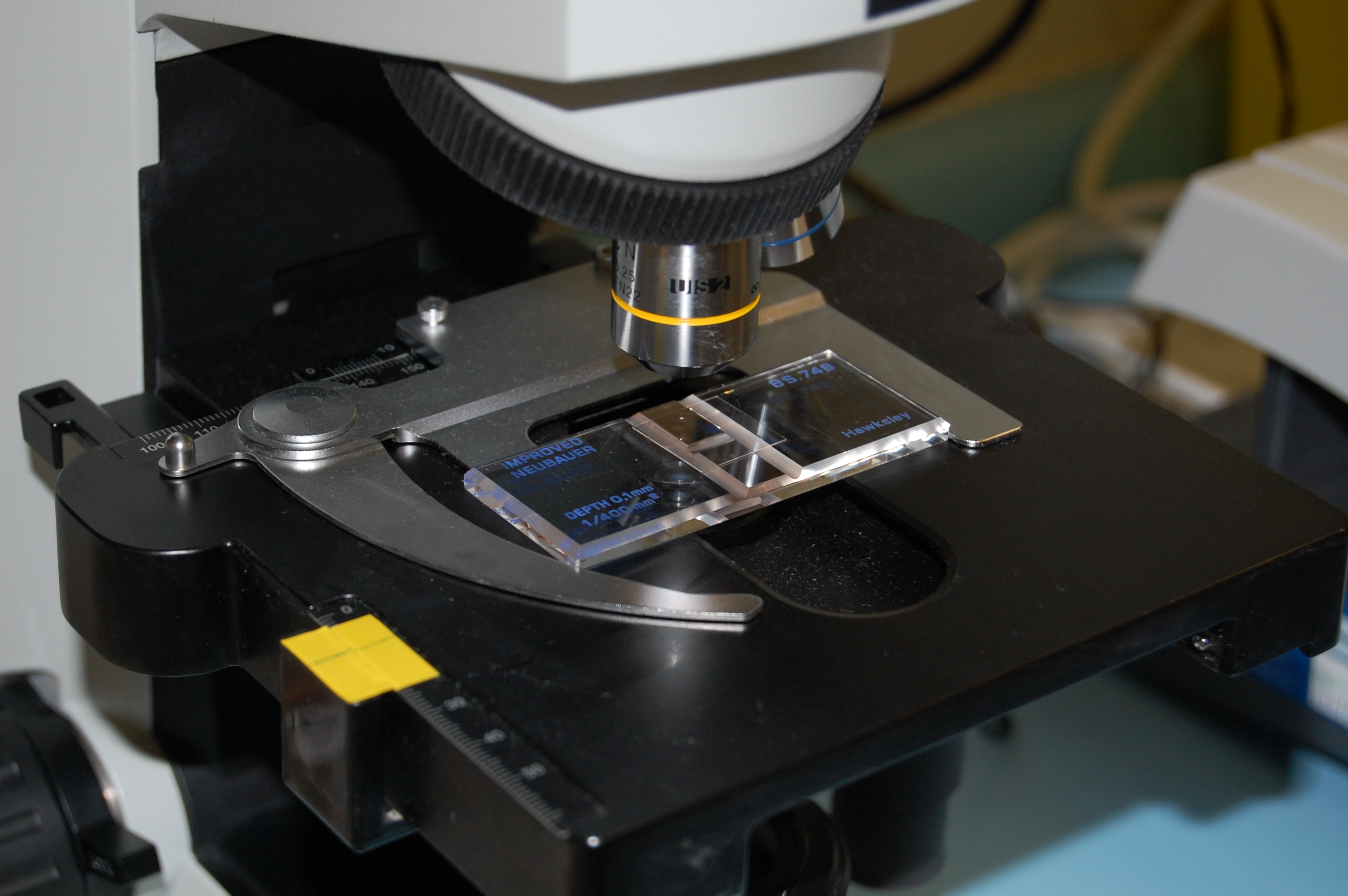
A Neubauer slide held in place on a microscope stand by a slide clamp on a cross-table.

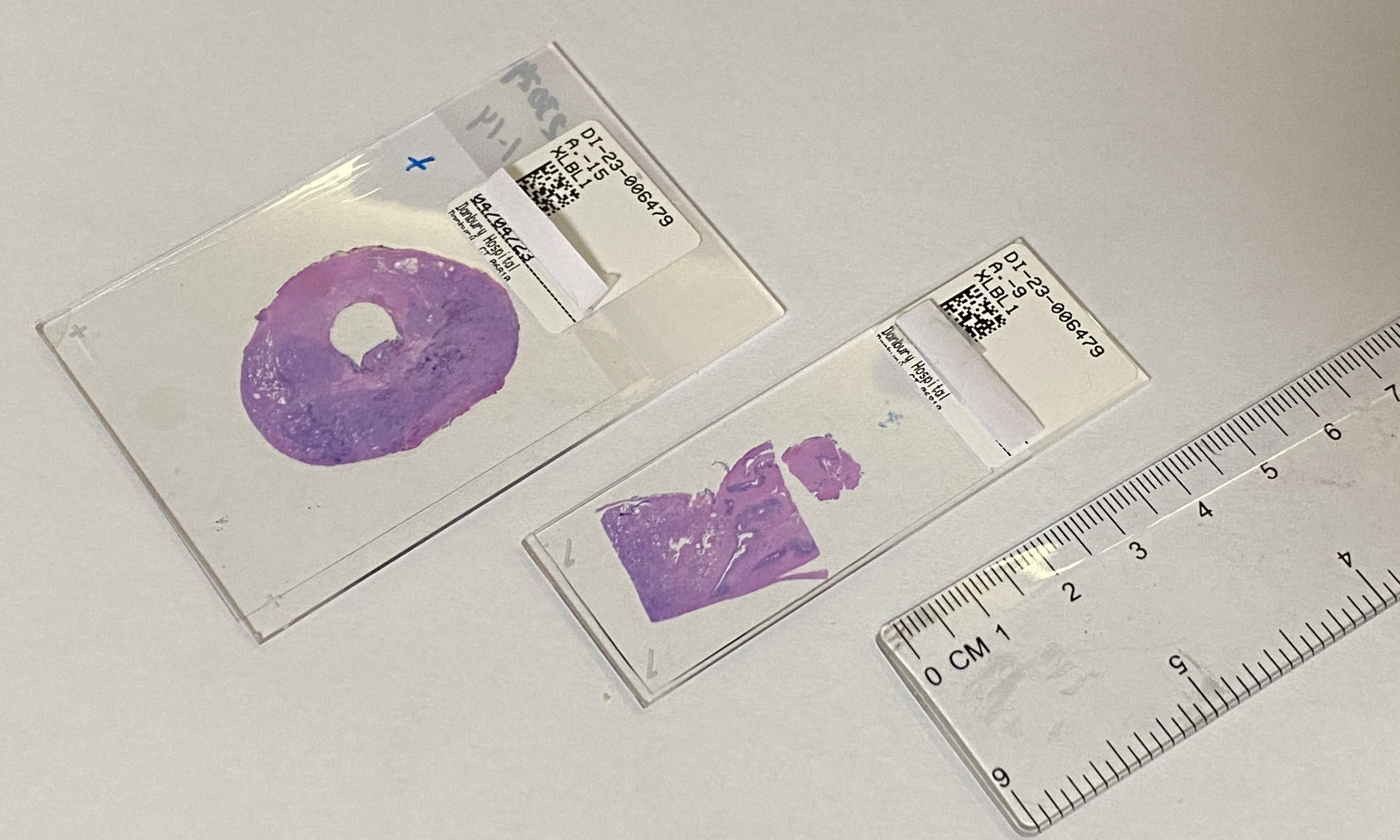
Standard (75 x 25 mm or 3x1″) and large (75 x 51 mm or 3x2″) microscope slide.

Some slides have a frosted or enamel-coated area at one end, for labeling with a pencil or pen. Slides may have special coatings applied by the manufacturer, e.g. for chemical inertness or enhanced cell adhesion. The coating may have a permanent electric charge to hold thin or powdery samples. Common coatings include poly-L-lysine, silanes, epoxy resins, or even gold.

== Mounting ==
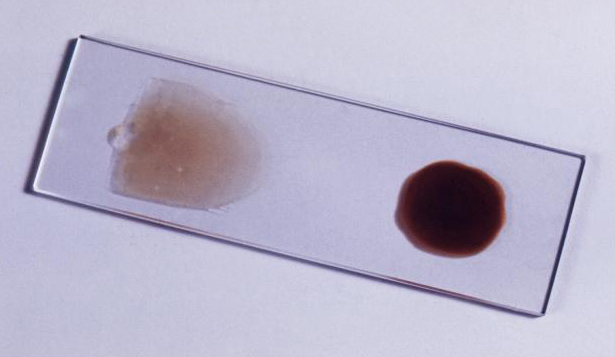
Blood smears for pathological examination, an example of wet mount

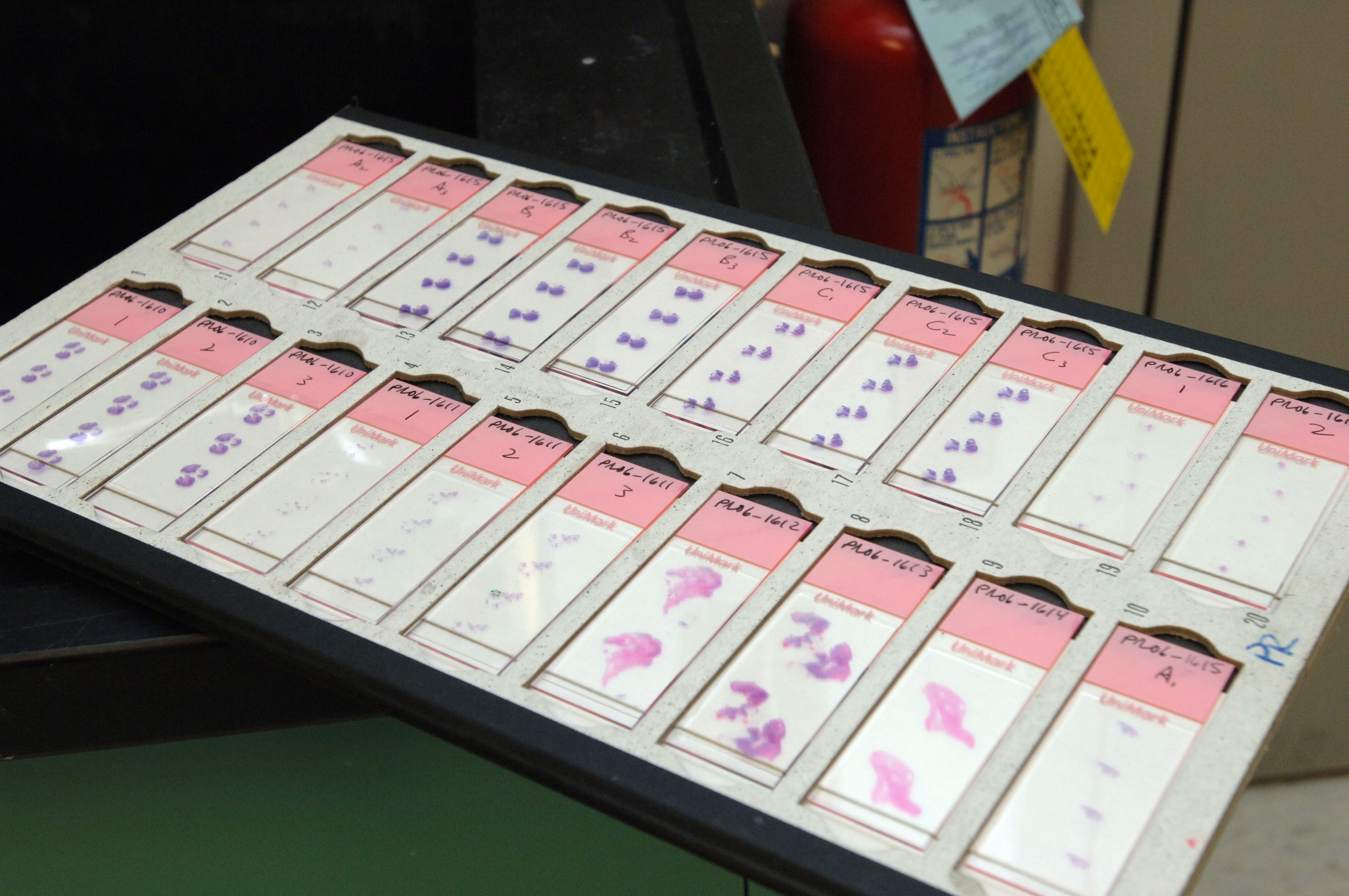
Microscope slides with prepared, stained, and labeled tissue specimens in a standard 20-slide folder

The mounting of specimens on microscope slides is often critical for successful viewing. The problem has been given much attention in the last two centuries and is a well-developed area with many specialized and sometimes quite sophisticated techniques. Specimens are often held into place using the smaller glass cover slips.

The main function of the cover slip is to keep solid specimens pressed flat, and liquid samples shaped into a flat layer of even thickness. This is necessary because high-resolution microscopes have a very narrow region within which they focus.

The cover glass often has several other functions. It holds the specimen in place (either by the weight of the cover slip or, in the case of a wet mount, by surface tension) and protects the specimen from dust and accidental contact. It protects the microscope's objective lens from contacting the specimen and vice versa; in oil immersion microscopy or water immersion microscopy the cover slip prevents contact between the immersion liquid and the specimen. The cover slip can be glued to the slide so as to seal off the specimen, retarding dehydration and oxidation of the specimen and also preventing contamination. A number of sealants are in use, including commercial sealants, laboratory preparations, or even regular clear nail polish, depending on the sample. A solvent-free sealant that can be used for live cell samples is "valap", a mixture of vaseline, lanolin and paraffin in equal parts. Microbial and cell cultures can be grown directly on the cover slip before it is placed on the slide, and specimens may be permanently mounted on the slip instead of on the slide.

Cover slips are available in a range of sizes and thicknesses. Using the wrong thickness can result in spherical aberration and a reduction in resolution and image intensity. Specialty objectives may be used to image specimens without coverslips, or may have correction collars that permit a user to accommodate for alternative coverslip thickness.

=== Dry mount ===
In a dry mount, the simplest kind of mounting, the object is merely placed on the slide. A cover slip may be placed on top to protect the specimen and the microscope's objective and to keep the specimen still and pressed flat. This mounting can be successfully used for viewing specimens like pollen, feathers, hairs, etc. It is also used to examine particles caught in transparent membrane filters (e.g., in analysis of airborne dust).

=== Wet mount or temporary mount ===
In a wet mount, the specimen is placed in a drop of iodine or other liquid held between the slide and the cover slip by surface tension. This method is commonly used, for example, to view microscopic organisms that grow in pond water or other liquid media, especially lakes.

=== Prepared mount or permanent mount ===
For pathological and biological research, the specimen usually undergoes a complex histological preparation that involves fixing it to prevent decay, removing any water contained in it, replacing the water with paraffin, cutting it into very thin sections using a microtome, placing the sections on a microscope slide, staining the tissue using various stains to reveal specific tissue components, clearing the tissue to render it transparent and covering it with a coverslip and mounting medium.

=== Strewn mount ===
Strewn mounting describes the production of palynological microscope slides by suspending a concentrated sample in distilled water, placing the samples on a slide, and allowing the water to evaporate.

=== Mounting media ===
The mounting medium is the solution in which the specimen is embedded, generally under a cover glass. Simple liquids like water or glycerol can be considered mounting media, though the term generally refers to compounds that harden into a permanent mount. Popular mounting media include Permount, and Hoyer's mounting medium and an alternative glycerine jelly Properties of a good mounting medium include having a refractive index close to that of glass (1.518), non-reactivity with the specimen, stability over time without crystallizing, darkening, or changing refractive index, solubility in the medium the specimen was prepared in (either aqueous or non-polar, such as xylene or toluene), and not causing the specimen stain to fade or leach.

==== Examples of mounting media ====
===== Aqueous =====
Popularly used in immunofluorescent cytochemistry where the fluorescence cannot be archived. The temporary storage must be done in a dark moist chamber. Common examples are:

1. Glycerol-PBS (9:1) with antiquench, e.g. any of the following
  1. p-phenylenediamine
  2. propyl gallate
  3. 1,4-Diazabicyclo (2,2,2)-octane (DABCO) (very popular)
  4. Ascorbic acid
  5. Mowiol or Gelvatol
2. Gelatin
3. Mount
4. Vectashield
5. Prolong Gold
6. CyGEL / CyGEL Sustain (to immobilize living, unfixed cells and organisms)

===== Non-aqueous =====
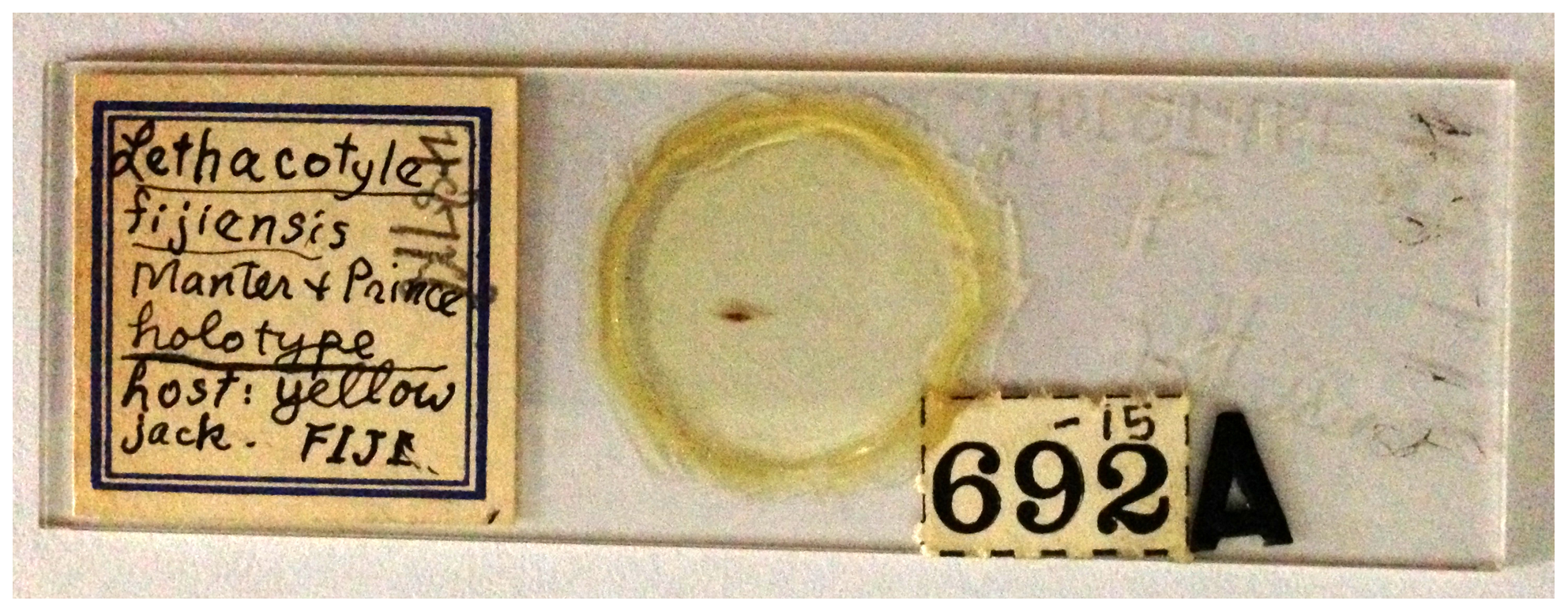
Slide of 60-year-old holotype specimen of a flatworm (Lethacotyle fijiensis) permanently mounted in Canada balsam

Used when a permanent mount is required

1. Permount (toluene and a polymer of a-pinene, b-pinene, dipentene, b-phellandrene)
2. Canada balsam
3. DPX (Distrene 80 – a commercial polystyrene, a plasticizer e.g. dibutyl phthalate and xylene)
4. DPX new (with xylene but free of carcinogenic dibutyl phthalate)
5. Entellan (with toluene)
6. Entellan new
7. Hempstead Halide Hoyer's Medium (a proprietary formulation of the traditional Hoyer's medium containing 60% Chloral, but free of known carcinogens)
8. Neo-Mount (compatible with aliphatic neo-clear but not compatible with aromatic solvents like xylene)

== Contrasting with other types/meanings of "mounting" ==
In contrast to mounting necessary for glass coverslips, somewhat similar mounting can be done for bulkier specimen preservation in glass containers in museums. However an entirely different type of mounting is done for sample preparation, which can be for biological or nonbiological materials and is further subdivided into "hot"(compressive) and "cold" (castable) type mounting processes. Though named "mounting", it is more akin to embedding in histology and should not be confused with the mounting described above. The term mounting in other fields has numerous other meanings.

== See also ==
- Petri dish
