= Optical relief =

Optical mineralogy property

Optical relief (usually noted as simply relief) is a visually observable property in optical mineralogy used to identify minerals based on their refractive index. Relief is determined by observing the degree to which grains stand out from a mounting medium of known refractive index, usually either oil or Canada balsam. Relief is an important part of the Becke line test.

== Magnitude ==
Minerals that stand out significantly (have a difference in refractive index of 0.12 or more) have high or strong relief and will have very sharp boundaries between itself and the material it is next to. Intermediate is 0.04 to 0.12, and low or weak is less than 0.04. Low-relief materials have boundaries that are hard to distinguish from each other.

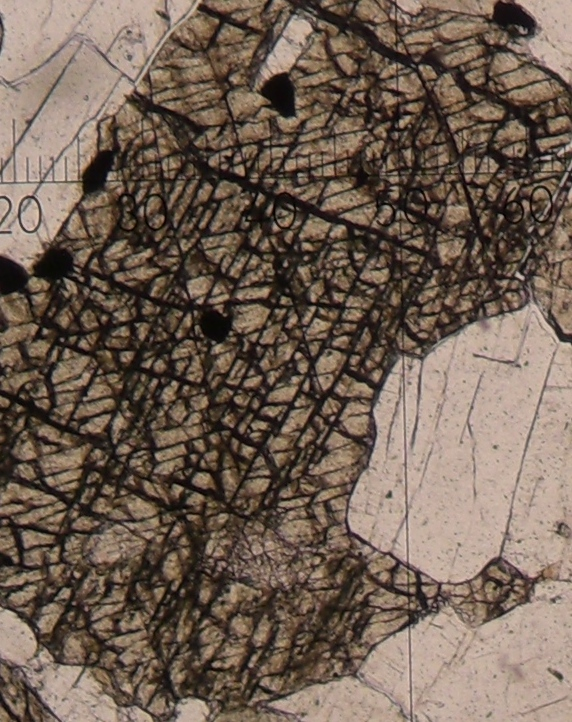
Thin section under plane-polarized light with the high-relief mineral clinopyroxene in the center surrounded by the low-relief mineral plagioclase feldspar

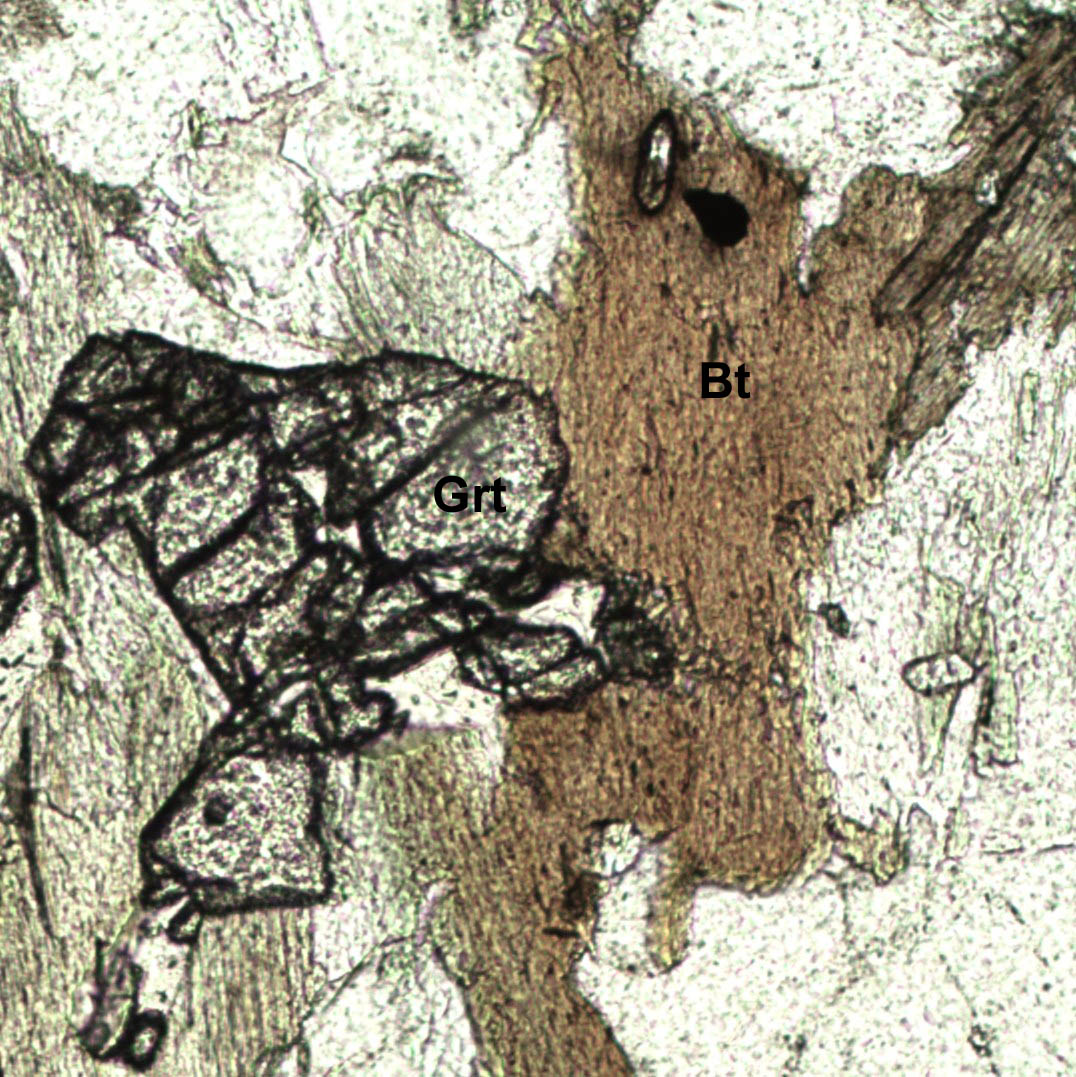
Thin section under plane-polarized light with the high-relief mineral garnet (Grt) next to the intermediate-relief mineral biotite (Bt)

== Polarity ==
Relief is said to be positive when the refractive index of the mineral is higher than the refractive index of the medium, and negative when the opposite occurs. In regular observations, only the magnitude of relief can be seen (minerals with positive and negative relief will look the same), and other techniques (such as the Becke line method) must be employed in order to determine whether a mineral has positive or negative relief.
