= Objective (optics) =

Lens or mirror in optical instruments

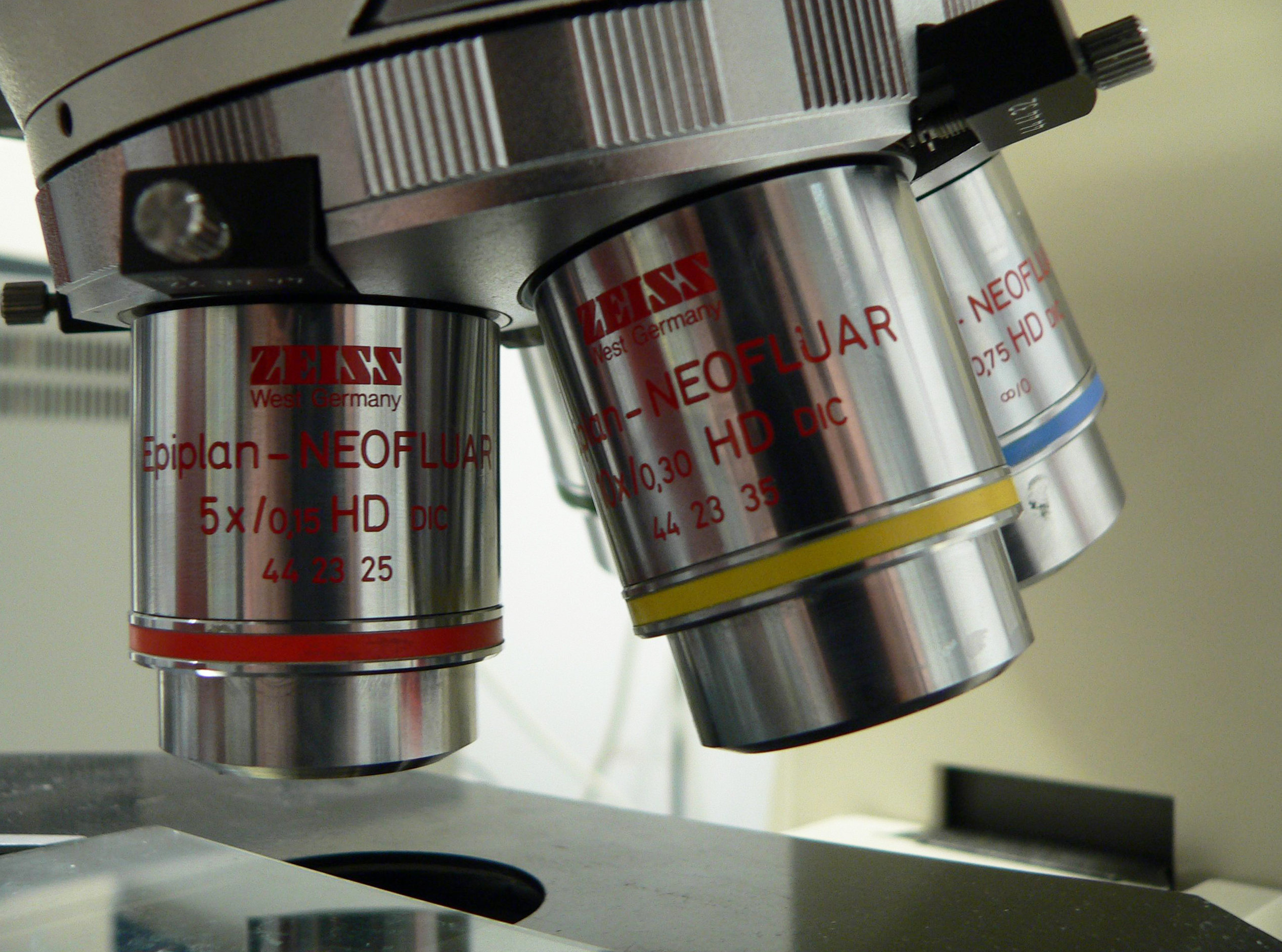
Several objective lenses on a microscope.

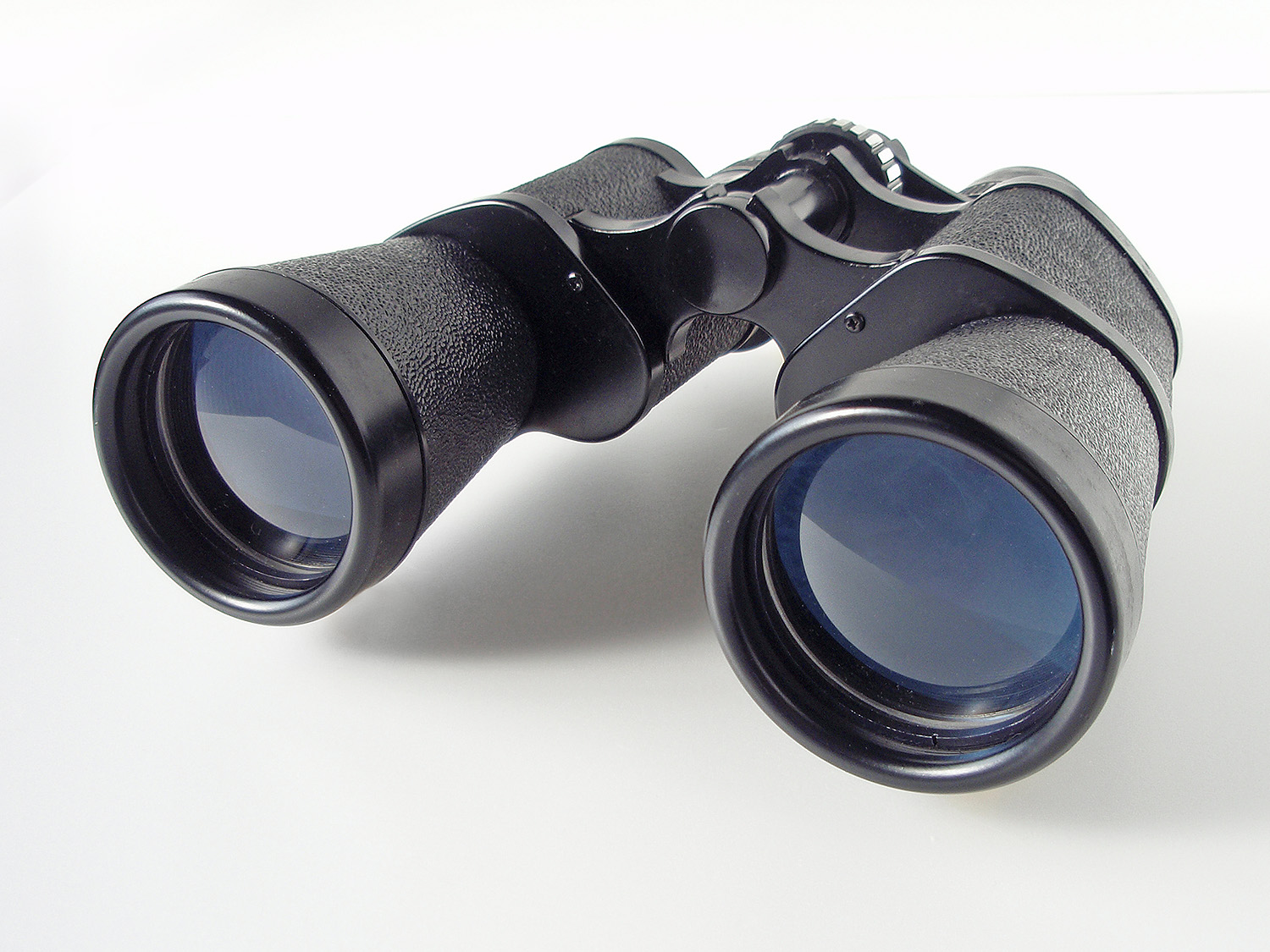
Objective lenses of binoculars

In optical engineering, an objective is an optical element that gathers light from an object being observed and focuses the light rays from it to produce a real image of the object. Objectives can be a single lens or mirror, or combinations of several optical elements. They are used in microscopes, binoculars, telescopes, cameras, slide projectors, CD players and many other optical instruments. Objectives are also called object lenses, object glasses, or objective glasses.

== Microscope objectives ==
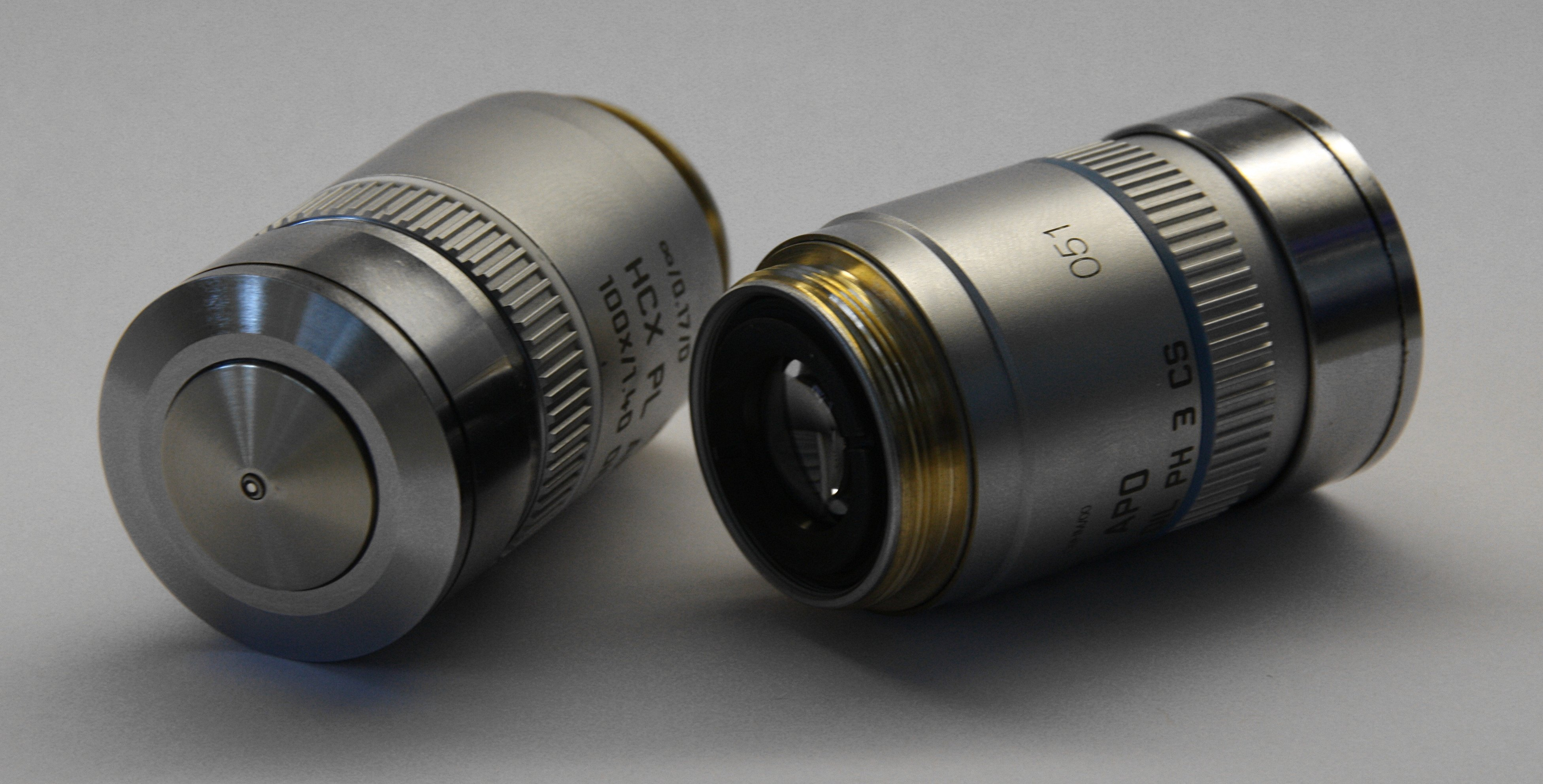
Two Leica oil immersion microscope objective lenses; left 100×, right 40×.

The objective lens of a microscope is the one at the bottom near the sample. At its simplest, it is a very high-powered magnifying glass, with very short focal length. This is brought very close to the specimen being examined so that the light from the specimen comes to a focus inside the microscope tube. The objective itself is usually a cylinder containing one or more lenses that are typically made of glass; its function is to collect light from the sample.

=== Magnification ===
One of the most important properties of microscope objectives is their magnification. The magnification typically ranges from 4× to 100×. It is combined with the magnification of the eyepiece to determine the overall magnification of the microscope; a 4× objective with a 10× eyepiece produces an image that is 40 times the size of the object.

A typical microscope has three or four objective lenses with different magnifications, screwed into a circular "nosepiece" which may be rotated to select the required lens. These lenses are often color coded for easier use. The least powerful lens is called the scanning objective lens, and is typically a 4× objective. The second lens is referred to as the small objective lens and is typically a 10× lens. The most powerful lens out of the three is referred to as the large objective lens and is typically 40–100×.

=== Numerical aperture ===
Numerical aperture for microscope lenses typically ranges from 0.10 to 1.25, corresponding to focal lengths of about 40 mm to 2 mm, respectively.

=== Mechanical tube length ===
Historically, microscopes were designed such that the objective lens would form an image in a specific plane near the eyepiece, which the eyepiece would re-image. Such microscopes were characterized by the mechanical tube length; the distance between the mounting locations for the objective and the eyepiece. Early English microscopes used a mechanical tube length of 10 inches (250 mm). In the 20th century most microscopes used the Royal Microscopical Society standard of 160 millimeters, while many Leitz microscopes used 170 millimeters. Objectives had to be chosen to match the mechanical tube length of the microscope.

Modern microscopes are often designed to use infinity correction, in which the light coming out of the objective lens is focused at infinity. This is denoted on the objective with the infinity symbol (∞).

=== Objective pupil diameter ===
The objective pupil diameter, also known as entrance pupil diameter or back aperture diameter, refers to the diameter of the rear opening of an objective lens. In dry infinity corrected objectives, this diameter $D$ is

$D = 2 \times NA \times f_{obj}$

where $NA$ is the numerical aperture, and $f_{obj}$ is the effective focal length. Magnification $M$ and effective focal length are related by

$f_{tube} = M f_{obj}$

where $f_{tube}$ is the tube lens focal length. Tube lens focal lengths vary by manufacturer: Leica and Nikon typically use 200 mm, Olympus uses 180 mm, and Zeiss uses 165 mm.

=== Cover thickness ===
Particularly in biological applications, samples are usually observed under a glass cover slip, which introduces distortions to the image. Objectives which are designed to be used with such cover slips will correct for these distortions, and typically have the thickness of the cover slip they are designed to work with written on the side of the objective (typically 0.17 mm).

In contrast, so called "metallurgical" objectives are designed for reflected light and do not use glass cover slips.

The distinction between objectives designed for use with or without cover slides is important for high numerical aperture (high magnification) lenses, but makes little difference for low magnification objectives.

=== Lens design ===
Basic glass lenses will typically result in significant and unacceptable chromatic aberration. Therefore, most objectives have some kind of correction to allow multiple colors to focus at the same point. The easiest correction is an achromatic lens, which uses a combination of crown glass and flint glass to bring two colors into focus. Achromatic objectives are a typical standard design.

In addition to oxide glasses, fluorite lenses are often used in specialty applications. These fluorite or semi-apochromat objectives deal with color better than achromatic objectives. To reduce aberration even further, more complex designs such as apochromat and superachromat objectives are also used.

All these types of objectives will exhibit some spherical aberration. While the center of the image will be in focus, the edges will be slightly blurry. When this aberration is corrected, the objective is called a "plan" objective, and has a flat image across the field of view.

=== Working distance ===
The working distance (sometimes abbreviated WD) is the distance between the sample and the objective. As magnification increases, working distances generally shrinks. When space is needed, special long working distance objectives can be used.

=== Immersion lenses ===
Some microscopes use an oil-immersion or water-immersion lens, which can have magnification greater than 100, and numerical aperture greater than 1. These objectives are specially designed for use with refractive index matching oil or water, which must fill the gap between the front element and the object. These lenses give greater resolution at high magnification. Numerical apertures as high as 1.6 can be achieved with oil immersion.

=== Mounting threads ===
The traditional screw thread used to attach the objective to the microscope was standardized by the Royal Microscopical Society in 1858. It was based on the British Standard Whitworth, with a 0.8 inch diameter and 36 threads per inch. This "RMS thread" or "society thread" is still in common use today. Alternatively, some objective manufacturers use designs based on ISO metric screw thread such as M26 × 0.75 and M25 × 0.75.

== Photography and imaging ==
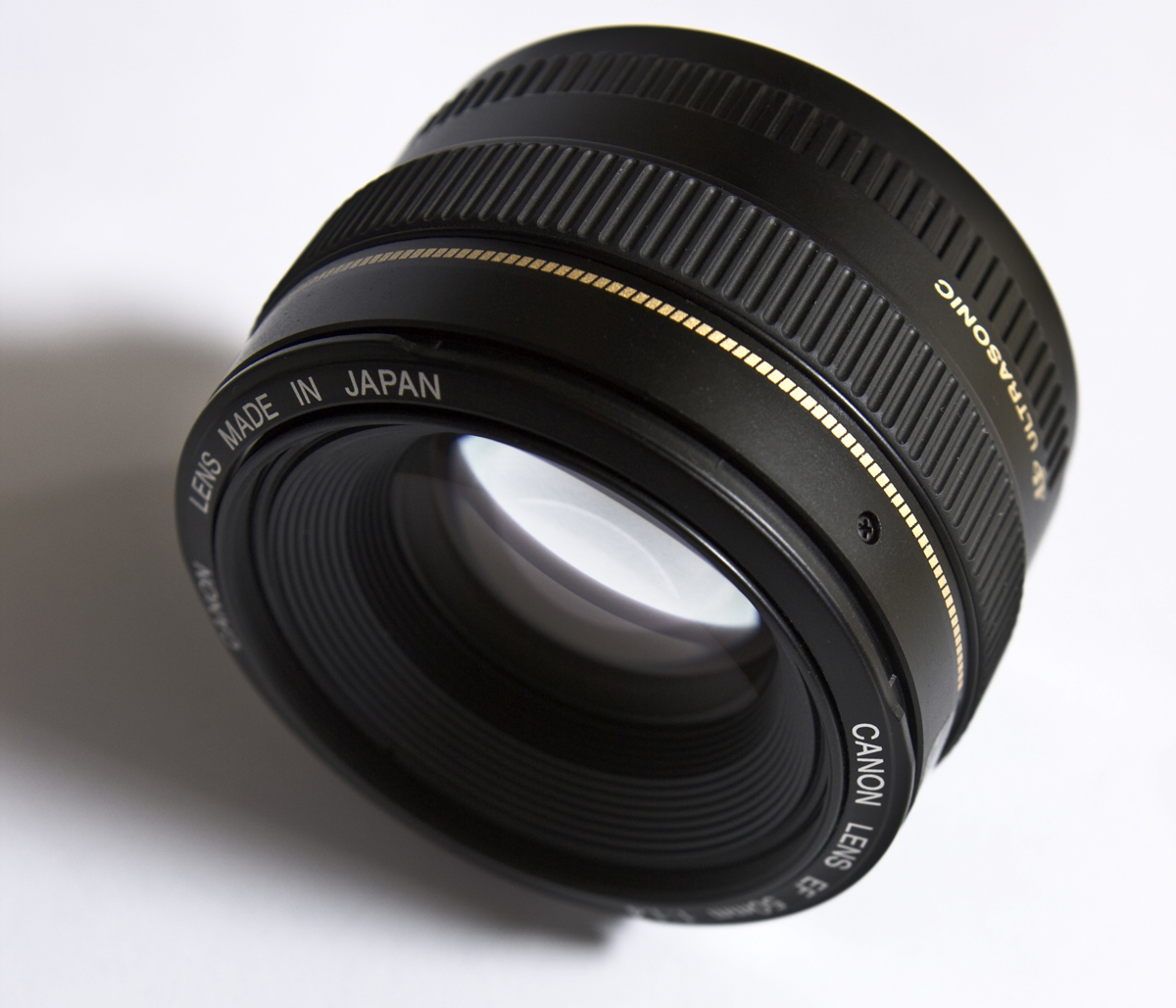
Camera photographic objective, focal length 50 mm, aperture 1:1.4

Camera lenses (usually referred to as "photographic objectives" instead of simply "objectives") need to cover a large focal plane so are made up of a number of optical lens elements to correct optical aberrations. Image projectors (such as video, movie, and slide projectors) use objective lenses that simply reverse the function of a camera lens, with lenses designed to cover a large image plane and project it at a distance onto another surface.

== Telescopes ==
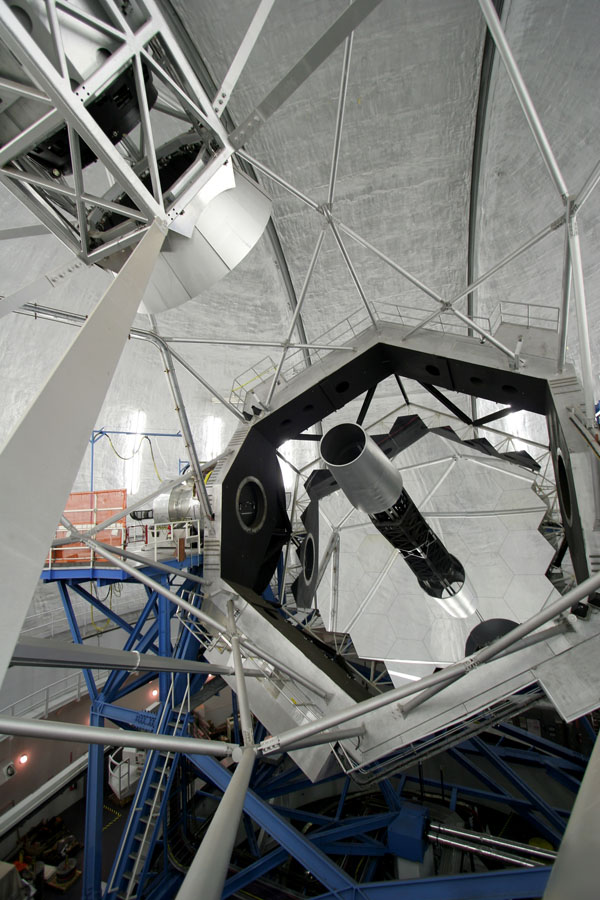
The segmented hexagonal objective mirror of the Keck 2 Telescope

In a telescope the objective is the lens at the front end of a refracting telescope (such as binoculars or telescopic sights) or the image-forming primary mirror of a reflecting or catadioptric telescope. A telescope's light-gathering power and angular resolution are both directly related to the diameter (or "aperture") of its objective lens or mirror. The larger the objective, the brighter the objects will appear and the more detail it can resolve.

== See also ==
- List of telescope parts and construction
- Etendue
