= Becke line test =

The Becke line test is a technique in optical mineralogy that helps determine the relative refractive index of two materials. It is done by lowering the stage (increasing the focal distance) of the petrographic microscope and observing which direction the light appears to move. This movement will always go into the material of higher refractive index. This index is determined by comparing two minerals directly or comparing a mineral to a reference material such as Canada balsam or an oil of known refractive index (oil immersion). When permanently mounted to a slide under a cover slip, the mounting medium is normally chosen to have the same refractive index as Canada balsam (n = 1.55) to avoid confusion when comparing with previously made slides. If a different mounting medium is used, its refractive index should be recorded on the slide, to avoid loss of the information. Media used for impregnating a specimen before sectioning (either for mechanical strength, or to pick out porosity with a contrasting colour) are also usually chosen with the same 1.55 refractive index. If a specimen is mounted without a cover slip – for example, for microprobe analysis, backscattered electron microscopy, reflected light microscopy – then an immersion oil can be chosen with whatever refractive index is desired for the study.

The method was developed by Friedrich Johann Karl Becke (1855–1931).
