= Optical mineralogy =

Optical properties of rocks and minerals

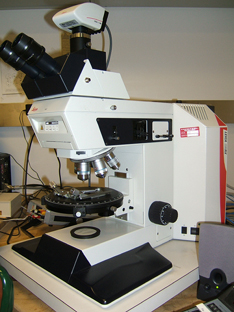
A petrographic microscope, which is an optical microscope fitted with cross-polarizing lenses, a conoscopic lens, and compensators (plates of anisotropic materials; gypsum plates and quartz wedges are common), for crystallographic analysis.

Optical mineralogy is the study of minerals and rocks by measuring their optical properties. Most commonly, rock and mineral samples are prepared as thin sections or grain mounts for study in the laboratory with a petrographic microscope. Optical mineralogy is used to identify the mineralogical composition of geological materials in order to help reveal their origin and evolution.

Some of the properties and techniques used include:

- Refractive index
- Birefringence
- Michel-Lévy Interference colour chart
- Pleochroism
- Extinction angle
- Conoscopic interference pattern (Interference figure)
- Becke line test
- Optical relief
- Sign of elongation (Length fast vs. length slow)
- Wave plate

== History ==
William Nicol, whose name is associated with the creation of the Nicol prism, is likely the first to prepare thin slices of mineral substances, and his methods were applied by Henry Thronton Maire Witham (1831) to the study of plant petrifactions. This method, of significant importance in petrology, was not at once made use of for the systematic investigation of rocks, and it was not until 1858 that Henry Clifton Sorby pointed out its value. Meanwhile, the optical study of sections of crystals had been advanced by Sir David Brewster and other physicists and mineralogists and it only remained to apply their methods to the minerals visible in rock sections.

== Sections ==
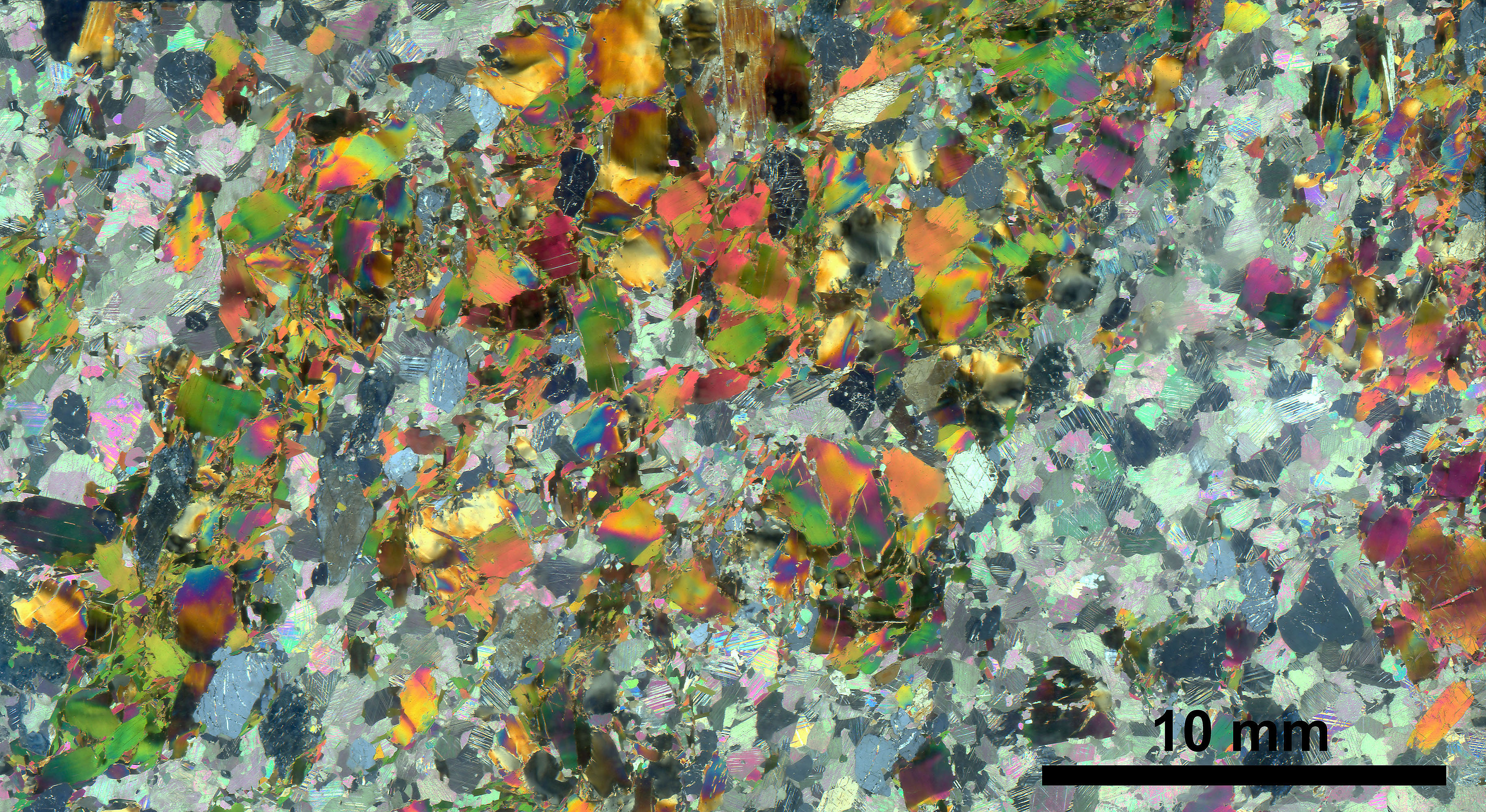
A scanned image of a thin section in cross polarized light.

A rock-section should be about one-thousandth of an inch (30 micrometres) in thickness, and is relatively easy to make. A thin splinter of the rock, about 1 centimetre may be taken; it should be as fresh as possible and free from obvious cracks. By grinding it on a plate of planed steel or cast iron with a little fine carborundum it is soon rendered flat on one side, and is then transferred to a sheet of plate glass and smoothed with the finest grained emery until all roughness and pits are removed, and the surface is a uniform plane. The rock chip is then washed, and placed on a copper or iron plate which is heated by a spirit or gas lamp. A microscopic glass slip is also warmed on this plate with a drop of viscous natural Canada balsam on its surface. The more volatile ingredients of the balsam are dispelled by the heat, and when that is accomplished the smooth, dry, warm rock is pressed firmly into contact with the glass plate so that the film of balsam intervening may be as thin as possible and free from air bubbles. The preparation is allowed to cool, and the rock chip is again ground down as before, first with carborundum and, when it becomes transparent, with fine emery until the desired thickness is obtained. It is then cleaned, again heated with an additional small amount of balsam, and covered with a cover glass. The labor of grinding the first surface may be avoided by cutting off a smooth slice with an iron disk armed with crushed diamond powder. A second application of the slitter after the first face is smoothed and cemented to the glass will, in expert hands, leave a section of rock so thin as to be transparent. In this way the preparation of a section may require only twenty minutes.

== Microscope ==
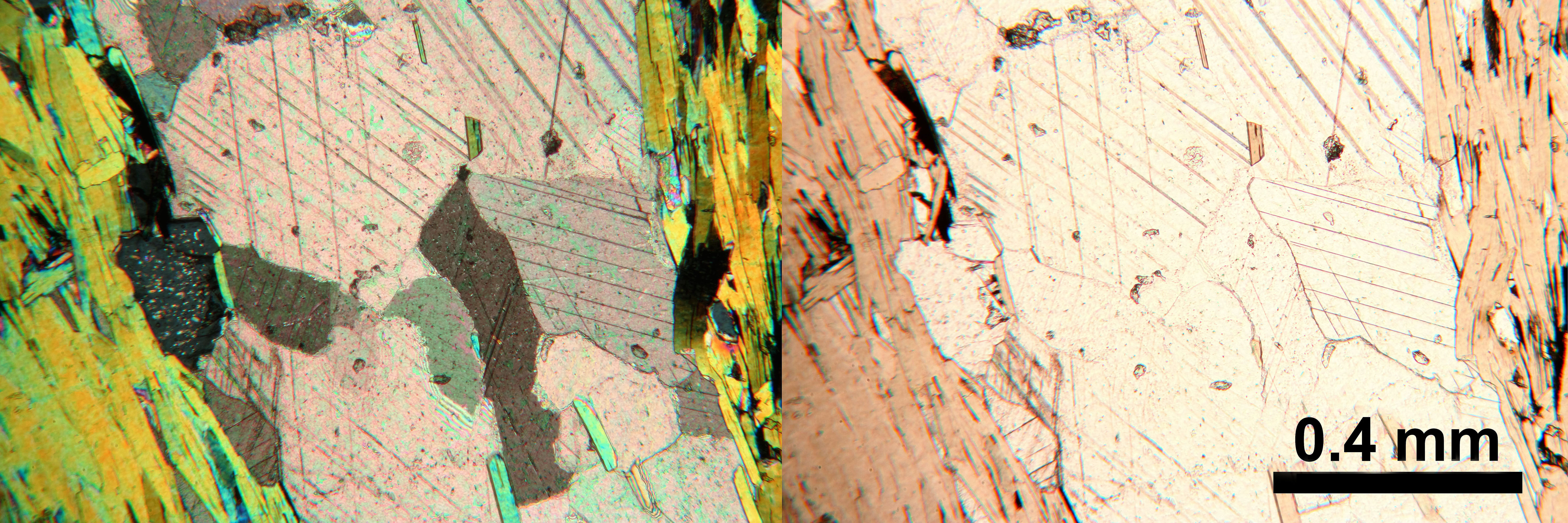
Photomicrographs of a thin section containing carbonate vein (grains with X-shaped cleavages) in mica (elongated crystals) rich rock. In cross-polarized light on left, plane-polarized light on right.

The microscope employed is usually one which is provided with a rotating stage beneath which there is a polarizer, while above the objective or eyepiece an analyzer is mounted; alternatively the stage may be fixed, and the polarizing and analyzing prisms may be capable of simultaneous rotation by means of toothed wheels and a connecting rod. If ordinary light and not polarized light is desired, both prisms may be withdrawn from the axis of the instrument; if the polarizer only is inserted the light transmitted is plane polarized; with both prisms in position the slide is viewed in cross-polarized light, also known as "crossed nicols". A microscopic rock-section in ordinary light, if a suitable magnification (e.g. around 30x) be employed, is seen to consist of grains or crystals varying in color, size, and shape.

== Characteristics of minerals ==
=== Color ===
Some minerals are colorless and transparent (quartz, calcite, feldspar, muscovite, etc.), while others are yellow or brown (rutile, tourmaline, biotite), green (diopside, hornblende, chlorite), blue (glaucophane). Many minerals may present a variety of colors, in the same or different rocks, or even multiple colours in a single mineral specimen called colour zonation. For example, the mineral tourmaline may have concentric zones of colour ranging from brown, yellow, pink, blue, green, violet, or grey, to colorless. Every mineral has one or more, most common tints. Recently, the field of digital mineral study and identification has been developing based on the optical properties of minerals, including through the use of artificial intelligence technologies.

=== Habit & Cleavage ===
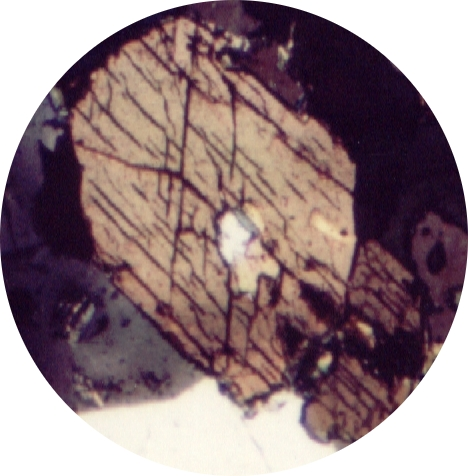
Amphibole in thin section exhibiting 60° cleavage angle.

The shapes of the crystals determine in a general way the outlines of the sections of them presented on the slides. If the mineral has one or more good cleavages, they will be indicated by sets of similarly oriented planes called cleavage planes.

The orientation of cleavage planes is determined by the crystal structure of a mineral and form preferentially through planes along which the weakest bonds lie, thus the orientation of cleavage planes can be used in optical mineralogy to identify minerals.

=== Refractive Index & Birefringence ===
Information regarding the refractive index of a mineral can be observed by making comparisons with the surrounding materials. This could be other minerals or the medium in which a grain is mounted. The greater the difference in Optical relief the greater the difference in refractive index between the media. The material with a lower refractive index and thus lower relief will appear to sink into the slide or mount, while a material with higher refractive index will have higher relief and appear to pop out. The Becke line test can also be used to compare the refractive index of two media.

=== Pleochroism ===
Further information is obtained by inserting the lower polarizer and rotating the section. The light vibrates in only one plane, and in passing through doubly refracting crystals in the slide, is, speaking generally, broken up into rays, which vibrate at right angles to one another. In many colored minerals such as biotite, hornblende, tourmaline, chlorite, these two rays have different colors, and when a section containing any of these minerals is rotated the change of color is often clearly noticeable. This property, known as "pleochroism" is of great value in the determination of mineral composition.

Pleochroism is often especially intense in small spots which surround minute enclosures of other minerals, such as zircon and epidote. These are known as "pleochroic halos".

=== Alteration Products ===
Some minerals decompose readily and become turbid and semi-transparent (e.g. feldspar); others remain always perfectly fresh and clear (e.g. quartz), while others yield characteristic secondary products (such as green chlorite after biotite). The inclusions in the crystals (both solid and fluid) are of great interest; one mineral may enclose another, or may contain spaces occupied by glass, by fluids or by gases.

== Microstructure ==
The structure of the rock - the relation of its components to one another - is usually clearly indicated, whether it is fragmented or massive; the presence of glassy matter in contradistinction to a completely crystalline or "holo-crystalline" condition; the nature and origin of organic fragments; banding, foliation or lamination; the pumiceous or porous structure of many lavas. These and many other characters, though often not visible in the hand specimens of a rock, are rendered obvious by the examination of a microscopic section. Various methods of detailed observation may be applied, such as the measurement of the size of the elements of the rock by the help of micrometers, their relative proportions by means of a glass plate ruled in small squares, the angles between cleavages or faces seen in section by the use of the rotating graduated stage, and the estimation of the refractive index of the mineral by comparison with those of different mounting media.

== Double refraction ==
If the analyzer is inserted in such a position that it is crossed relatively to the polarizer, the field of view will be dark where there are no minerals or where the light passes through isotropic substances such as glass, liquids and cubic crystals. All other crystalline bodies, being doubly refracting, will appear bright in some position as the stage is rotated. The only exception to this rule is provided by sections which are perpendicular to the optic axes of birefringent crystals, which remain dark or nearly dark during a whole rotation, the investigation of which is frequently important.

=== Extinction ===
Doubly refracting mineral sections will in all cases appear black in certain positions as the stage is rotated. They are said to "go extinct" when this takes place. The angle between these and any cleavages can be measured by rotating the stage and recording these positions. These angles are characteristic of the system to which the mineral belongs, and often of the mineral species itself (see Crystallography). To facilitate measurement of extinction angles, various types of eyepieces have been devised, some having a stereoscopic calcite plate, others with two or four plates of quartz cemented together. These are often found to give more precise results than are obtained by observing only the position in which the mineral section is most completely dark between crossed nicols.

The mineral sections when not extinguished are not only bright, but are colored, and the colors they show depend on several factors, the most important of which is the strength of the double refraction. If all the sections are of the same thickness, as is nearly true of well-made slides, the minerals with strongest double refraction yield the highest polarization colors. The order in which the colors are arranged is expressed in what is known as Newton's scale, the lowest being dark grey, then grey, white, yellow, orange, red, purple, blue, and so on. The difference between the refractive indexes of the ordinary and the extraordinary ray in quartz is .009, and in a rock-section about 1/500 of an inch thick, this mineral gives grey and white polarization colors; nepheline with weaker double refraction gives dark grey; augite on the other hand will give red and blue, while calcite with the stronger double refraction will appear pinkish or greenish white. All sections of the same mineral, however, will not have the same color: sections perpendicular to an optic axis will be nearly black, and, in general, the more nearly any section approaches this direction the lower its polarization colors will be. By taking the average, or the highest color given by any mineral, the relative value of its double refraction can be estimated, or if the thickness of the section be precisely known the difference between the two refractive indexes can be ascertained. If the slides are thick the colors will be on the whole higher than on thin slides.

It is often important to find out whether of the two axes of elasticity (or vibration traces) in the section is that of greater elasticity (or lesser refractive index). The quartz wedge or selenite plate enables this. Suppose a doubly refracting mineral section so placed that it is "extinguished"; if now is rotated through 45 degrees it will be brightly illuminated. If the quartz wedge be passed across it so that the long axis of the wedge is parallel to the axis of elasticity in the section the polarization colors will rise or fall. If they rise the axes of greater elasticity in the two minerals are parallel; if they sink the axis of greater elasticity in the one is parallel to that of lesser elasticity in the other. In the latter case by pushing the wedge sufficiently far complete darkness or compensation will result. Selenite wedges, selenite plates, mica wedges and mica plates are also used for this purpose. A quartz wedge also may be calibrated by determining the amount of double refraction in all parts of its length. If now it be used to produce compensation or complete extinction in any doubly refracting mineral section, we can ascertain what is the strength of the double refraction of the section because it is obviously equal and opposite to that of a known part of the quartz wedge.

A further refinement of microscopic methods consists of the use of strongly convergent polarized light (conoscopic methods). This is obtained by a wide angled achromatic condenser above the polarizer, and a high power microscopic objective. Those sections are most useful which are perpendicular to an optic axis, and consequently remain dark on rotation. If they belong to uniaxial crystals they show a dark cross or convergent light between crossed nicols, the bars of which remain parallel to the wires in the field of the eyepiece. Sections perpendicular to an optic axis of a biaxial mineral under the same conditions show a dark bar which on rotation becomes curved to a hyperbolic shape. If the section is perpendicular to a "bisectrix" (see Crystallography) a black cross is seen which on rotation opens out to form two hyperbolas, the apices of which are turned towards one another. The optic axes emerge at the apices of the hyperbolas and may be surrounded by colored rings, though owing to the thinness of minerals in rock sections these are only seen when the double refraction of the mineral is strong. The distance between the axes as seen in the field of the microscope depends partly on the axial angle of the crystal and partly on the numerical aperture of the objective. If it is measured by means of eye-piece micrometer, the optic axial angle of the mineral can be found by a simple calculation. The quartz wedge, quarter mica plate or selenite plate permit the determination of the positive or negative character of the crystal by the changes in the color or shape of the figures observed in the field. These operations are similar to those employed by the mineralogist in the examination of plates cut from crystals.

=== Examination of rock powders ===
Although rocks are now studied principally in microscopic sections the investigation of fine crushed rock powders, which was the first branch of microscopic petrology to receive attention, is still actively used. The modern optical methods are readily applicable to transparent mineral fragments of any kind. Minerals are almost as easily determined in powder as in section, but it is otherwise with rocks, as the structure or relation of the components to one another. This is an element of great importance in the study of the history and classification of rocks, and is almost completely destroyed by grinding them to powder.
