= Oil immersion =

Light microscopy technique

Principle of immersion microscopy. Path of rays with immersion medium (yellow) (left half) and without (right half). Rays (black) coming from the object (red) at a certain angle and going through the cover-slip (orange, as is the slide at the bottom) can enter the objective (dark blue) only when immersion is used. Otherwise, the refraction at the cover-slip-air interface causes the ray to miss the objective and its information is lost.

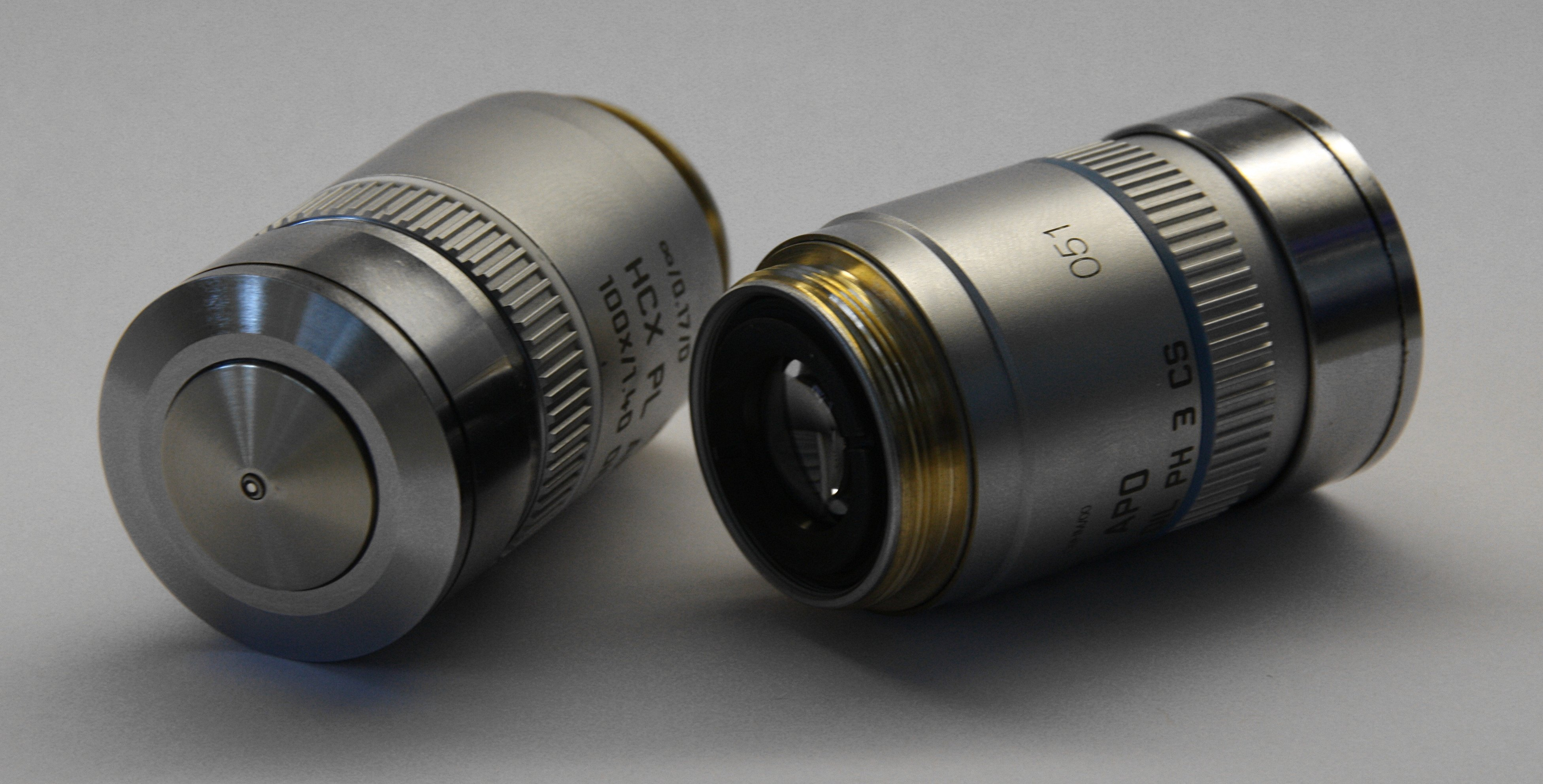
Two Leica oil-immersion objective lenses. Oil-immersion objective lenses look superficially identical to non-oil-immersion lenses.

In light microscopy, oil immersion is a technique used to increase the resolving power of a microscope. This is achieved by immersing both the objective lens and the specimen in a transparent oil of high refractive index, thereby increasing the numerical aperture of the objective lens.

Without oil, light waves reflect off the slide specimen through the glass cover, slip through the air, and into the microscope lens (see the colored figure to the right). Unless a wave comes out at a 90-degree angle, it bends when it hits a new substance, the amount of bend depending on the angle. This distorts the image. Air has a different index of refraction than glass, making for a larger bend compared to oil, which has an index similar to glass. Specially manufactured oil can have nearly exactly the same refractive index as glass, making an oil-immersed lens nearly as effective as having glass entirely around the sample (which would be impractical).

Immersion oils are transparent oils that have specific optical and viscosity characteristics necessary for use in microscopy. Typical oils used have an index of refraction of around 1.515. An oil-immersion objective is an objective lens specially designed to be used in this way. Many condensers also give optimal resolution when the condenser lens is immersed in oil.

== Theoretical background ==
Lenses reconstruct the light scattered by an object. To successfully achieve this end, ideally, all the diffraction orders have to be collected. This is related to the opening angle of the lens and its refractive index. The resolution of a microscope is defined as the minimum separation needed between two objects under examination in order for the microscope to discern them as separate objects. This minimum distance is labelled δ. If two objects are separated by a distance shorter than δ, then they will appear as a single object in the microscope.

A measure of the resolving power, R.P., of a lens is given by its numerical aperture, NA:

$$\delta=\frac{\lambda}{\mathrm{2NA}}$$

where λ is the wavelength of light. From this it is clear that a good resolution (small δ) is connected with a high numerical aperture.

The numerical aperture of a lens is defined as

$$\mathrm{NA} = n \sin \alpha_0\;$$

where α_{0} is half the angle spanned by the objective lens seen from the sample, and n is the refractive index of the medium between the lens and specimen (≈1 for air).

State-of-the-art objectives can have numerical apertures of up to 0.95. Because sin α_{0} ≤ 1, the numerical aperture can never be greater than unity for an objective lens in air. If the space between the objective lens and the specimen is filled with oil, however, the numerical aperture can obtain values greater than 1. This is because oil has a refractive index greater than 1.

== Oil-immersion objectives ==
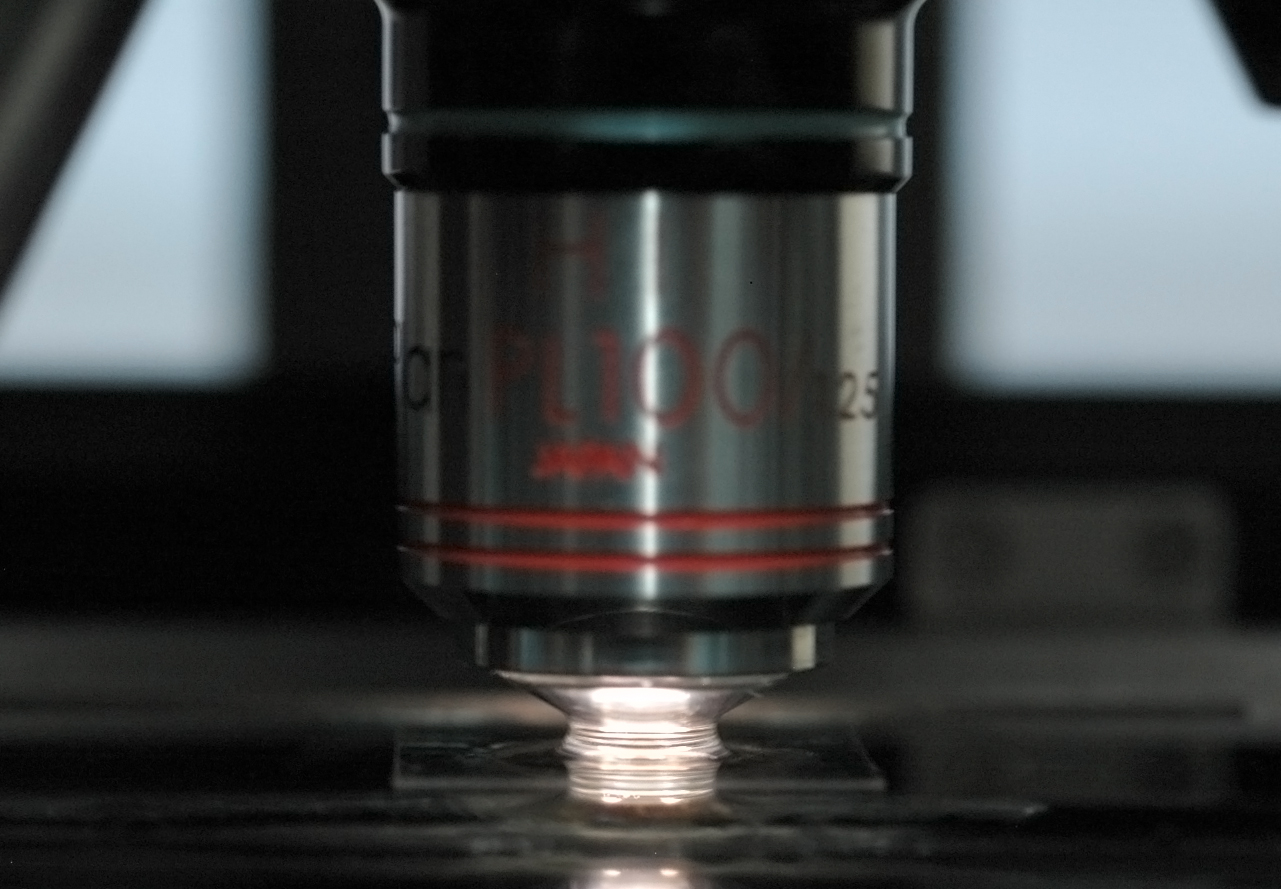
Oil-immersion objective in use

From the above it is understood that oil between the specimen and the objective lens improves the resolving power by a factor 1/n. Objectives specifically designed for this purpose are known as oil-immersion objectives.

Oil-immersion objectives are used only at very large magnifications that require high resolving power. Objectives with high-power magnification have short focal lengths, facilitating the use of oil. The oil is applied to the specimen (conventional microscope), and the stage is raised, immersing the objective in oil. (In inverted microscopes the oil is applied to the objective).

The refractive indices of the oil and of the glass in the first lens element are nearly the same, which means that the refraction of light will be small upon entering the lens (the oil and glass are optically very similar). The correct immersion oil for an objective lens has to be used to ensure that the refractive indices match closely. Use of an oil-immersion lens with the incorrect immersion oil, or without immersion oil altogether, will suffer from spherical aberration. The strength of this effect depends on the size of the refractive index mismatch.

Oil immersion can generally only be used on rigidly mounted specimens; otherwise, the surface tension of the oil can move the coverslip and so move the sample underneath. This can also happen on inverted microscopes because the coverslip is below the slide.

== Immersion oil ==
Before the development of synthetic immersion oils in the 1940s, cedar tree oil was widely used. Cedar oil has an index of refraction of approximately 1.516. The numerical aperture of cedar tree oil objectives is generally around 1.3. Cedar oil has a number of disadvantages: it absorbs blue and ultraviolet light, yellows with age, has sufficient acidity to potentially damage objectives with repeated use (by attacking the cement used to join lenses), and can change viscosity upon dilution with solvent (and thereby change its refraction index and dispersion). Cedar oil must be removed from the objective immediately after use before it can harden, since removing hardened cedar oil can damage the lens.

In modern microscopy, synthetic immersion oils are more commonly used, as they eliminate most of these problems. NA values of 1.6 can be achieved with different oils. Unlike natural oils, synthetic ones do not harden on the lens and can typically be left on the objective for months at a time, although to best maintain a microscope it is best to remove the oil daily. Over time, oil can enter the front lens of the objective or seep into the barrel of the objective and damage the objective.

There are different types of immersion oils with different properties based on the type of microscopy. Types A and B are both general-purpose immersion oils with different viscosities. The less viscous Type A oil traps fewer air bubbles, while the more viscous Type B oil is good for serial imaging of multiple slides with one application. Type F immersion oil is best used for fluorescent imaging at room temperature (23 °C), while type N oil is made to be used at body temperature (37 °C) for live-cell imaging applications. All have a n_{D} of 1.515, quite similar to the original cedar oil.

Refractive index of immersion oil changes with temperature. Consequently, combination of immersion medium and coverslip thickness that gives optimal imaging at room temperature may be different from that required at 37 °C. Some immersion objectives include correction collars to compensate for temperature induced changes in refractive index.

== See also ==
- Immersion lithography
- Index-matching material
- Solid immersion lens
- Water immersion objective
