= Water immersion objective =

In light microscopy, a water immersion objective is a specially designed objective lens used to increase the resolution of the microscope. This is achieved by immersing both the lens and the specimen in water which has a higher refractive index than air, thereby increasing the numerical aperture of the objective lens.

== Applications ==
Water immersion objectives are used not only at very large magnifications that require high resolving power, but also of moderate power as there are water immersion objectives as low as 4X. Objectives with high power magnification have short focal lengths, facilitating the use of water. The water is applied to the specimen (conventional microscope), and the stage is raised, immersing the objective in water. Sometimes with water dipping objectives, the objective is directly immersed in the solution of water which contains the specimens to look at. Electrophoretic preparations used in the case of comet assay can benefit from the use of water objectives.

The refractive index of the water (1.33) is closer to those of imaged materials or to the glass of the cover-slip, so more light will be collected/focused by this type of objective comparing to air-immersion ones, leading to a range of higher numerical apertures (NA).

== Correction collar ==
Unlike oil, water does not have the same or near identical refractive value as the cover slip glass, so a correction collar is needed to be able to variate for its thickness. Lenses without a correction collar generally are made for the use of a 0.17 mm cover slip or for use without a coverslip (dipping lens).

== See also ==
- Oil immersion objective
- Microscopy
- Optical microscope
- Index-matching material
