= Solid immersion lens =

A solid immersion lens (SIL) has higher magnification and higher numerical aperture than common lenses by filling the object space with a high-refractive-index solid material. SIL was originally developed for enhancing the spatial resolution of optical microscopy. There are two types of SIL:

- Hemispherical SIL: Theoretically capable of increasing the numerical aperture of an optical system by $n$, the index of refraction of the material of the lens.
- Weierstrass SIL (superhemispherical SIL or superSIL): the height of the truncated sphere is $(1+1/n)r$, where r is the radius of the spherical surface of the lens. Theoretically capable of increasing the numerical aperture of an optical system by $n^2$.

== Applications of SIL ==
=== Solid immersion lens microscopy ===
All optical microscopes are diffraction-limited because of the wave nature of light. Current research focuses on techniques to go beyond this limit known as the Rayleigh criterion. The use of SIL can achieve spatial resolution better than the diffraction limit in air, for both far-field imaging and near-field imaging.

=== Optical data storage ===
Because SIL provides high spatial resolution, the spot size of laser beam through the SIL can be smaller than diffraction limit in air, and the density of the associated optical data storage can be increased.

=== Photolithography ===
Similar to immersion lithography, the use of SIL can increase spatial resolution of projected photolithographic patterns, creating smaller components on wafers.

Emission Microscopy

Offers advantages for semiconductor wafer emission microscopy which detects faint emissions of light (Photons) from electron-hole recombination under the influence of electrical stimulation.
