= Canada balsam =

Turpentine made from balsam fir tree resin

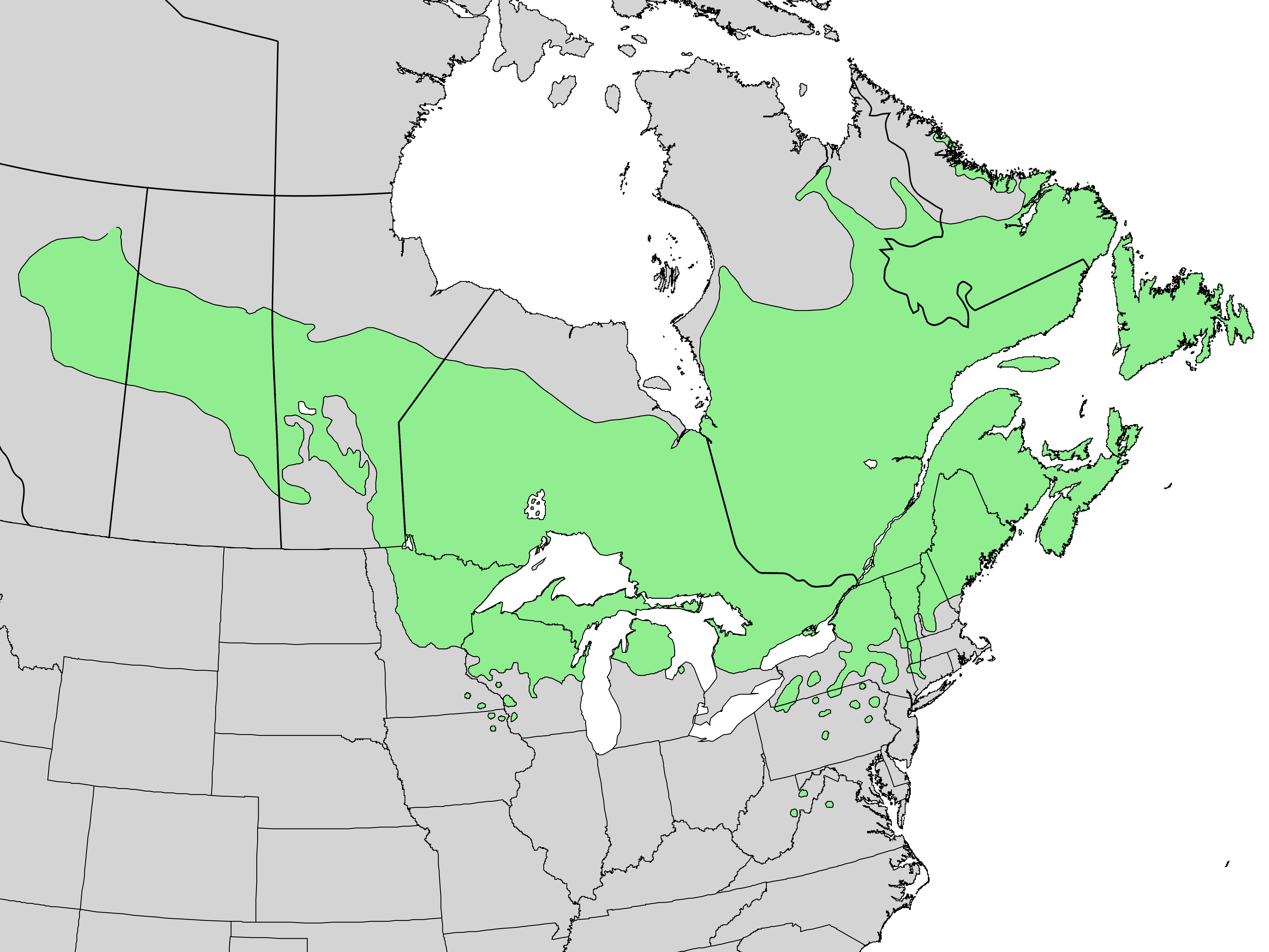
The balsam fir tree from which Canada Balsam is obtained is so named because it is found almost entirely within Canada in the boreal forest region.

Canada balsam, also called Canada turpentine or balsam of fir, is the oleoresin of the balsam fir tree (Abies balsamea) of boreal North America. The resin, dissolved in essential oils, is a viscous, sticky, colourless or yellowish liquid that turns to a transparent yellowish mass when the essential oils have been allowed to evaporate.

Canada balsam is amorphous when dried. It has poor thermal and solvent resistance.

== Uses ==
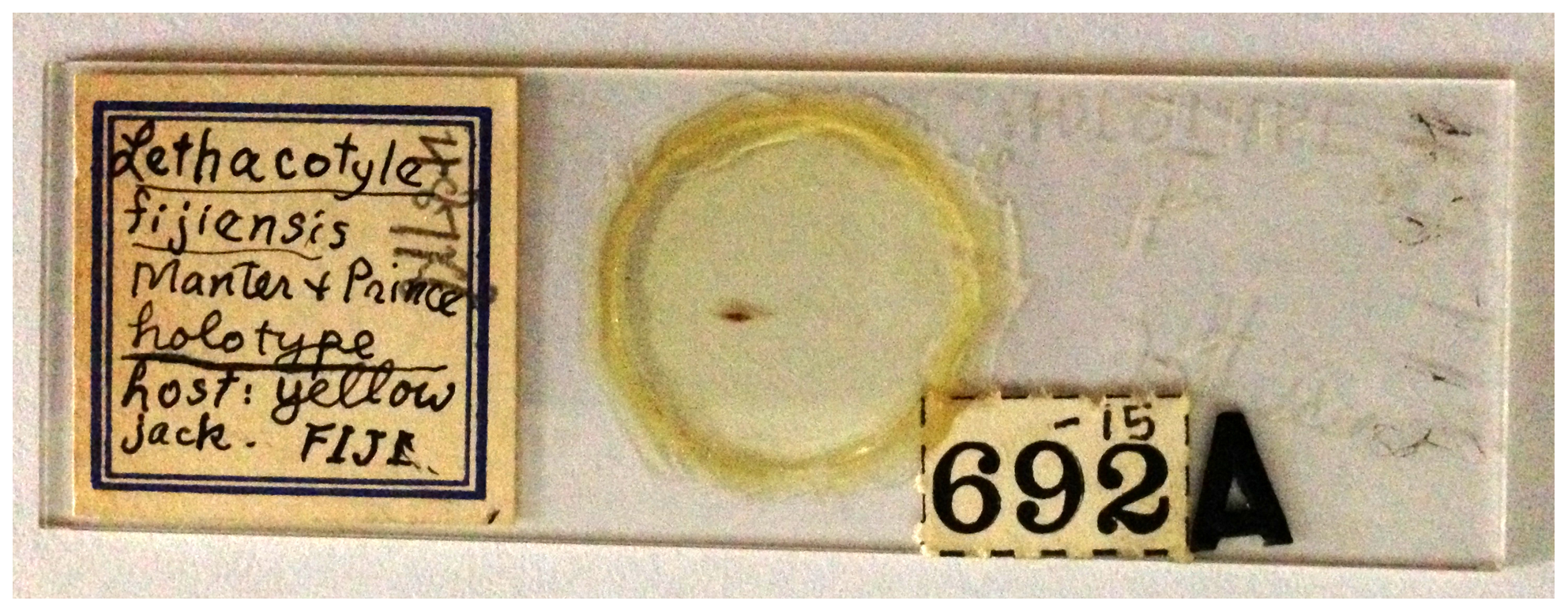
Slide of a holotype specimen of a flatworm (Lethacotyle fijiensis) permanently mounted in Canada balsam in 1953

Due to its high optical quality and the similarity of its refractive index to that of crown glass (n = 1.52), purified and filtered Canada balsam was traditionally used in optics as an invisible-when-dry glue for glass, such as lens elements. Other optical elements can be cemented with Canada balsam, such as two prisms bonded to form a beam splitter.

Canada balsam was also commonly used for making permanent microscope slides. From about 1830 molten Canada balsam was used for microscope slides. Canada balsam in solution was then introduced in 1843, becoming popular in the 1850s. In biology, for example, it can be used to conserve microscopic samples by sandwiching the sample between a microscope slide and a glass coverslip, using Canada balsam to glue the arrangement together and enclose the sample to conserve it.

Canada balsam dissolved in xylene is also used for preparing slide mounts. Some workers prefer terpene resin for slide mounts, as it is both less acidic and cheaper than balsam.

Another important application of Canada balsam is in the construction of the Nicol prism. A Nicol prism consists of a calcite crystal cut into two halves. Canada balsam is placed between the two layers. Calcite is an anisotropic crystal and has different refractive indices for rays polarized along directions parallel and perpendicular to its optic axis. These rays with differing refractive indices are known as the ordinary and extraordinary rays. The refractive index for Canada balsam is in between the refractive index for the ordinary and extraordinary rays. Hence the ordinary ray will be totally internally reflected. The emergent ray will be linearly polarized, and traditionally this has been one of the popular ways of producing polarized light.

Some other uses (traditional and current) include:

- In geology, it is used as a common thin section cement and glue and for refractive-index studies and tests, such as the Becke line test;
- To fix scratches in glass (car glass, for instance) as invisibly as possible;
- In oil painting, to achieve glow and facilitate fusion;
- In Buckley's cough syrup.

Balsam was phased out as an optical adhesive during World War II, in favour of polyester, epoxy, and urethane-based adhesives. In modern optical manufacturing, UV-cured epoxies are often used to bond lens elements. Synthetic resins have largely replaced organic balsams for use in slide mounts.

== See also ==
- Balm of Gilead, a healing compound made from the resinous gum of Commiphora gileadensis.
